= Outline of linguistics =

Overview of and topical guide to linguistics

The following outline is provided as an overview and topical guide to linguistics:

Linguistics is the scientific study of language. Someone who engages in this study is called a linguist. Linguistics has two subdivisions, general and applied.

== Branches of linguistics ==
=== Subfields of linguistics ===
- General linguistics
  - Phonetics – the study of the speech faculty
  - Phonology – the usage of vocalized sounds and systems of sounds to form language
  - Morphology – the property of sound and meaning dynamics in language
  - Syntax – the property of grammar that governs sentence structure
  - Semantics – the study of meaning as encoded in grammar
  - Pragmatics – the study of how context contributes to meaning
  - Graphemics – the study of writing systems
    - Graphetics – the study of writing shapes as assigned to sounds or ideas
- Theoretical linguistics – the study of language as an abstract object
  - Generative linguistics – an approach which seeks to ground grammar in a specialized language module
  - Formalism (linguistics) – the theory of language as a formal system with mathematical-logical rules and a formal grammar
  - Functional linguistics – language as used and coming from use
  - Quantitative linguistics – the study of quantitative language laws and corresponding general theories
  - Formal semantics – the study of semantics through formal logic-based models
- Descriptive linguistics – describing how a particular language is used
  - Anthropological linguistics – the place of language in its wider social and cultural context, and its role in making and maintaining cultural practices and societal structures
  - Historical linguistics – the study of historical language change over time
    - Comparative linguistics – comparing languages to find similarities and historical connections
  - Etymology – the study of word histories and origins
  - Lexicology – the study of vocabularies and the structural relationships between many different words
  - Sociolinguistics – the study of society's effects on language
  - Discourse analysis – analysis of language use in texts (spoken, written, or signed)
  - Linguistic typology – comparative study of the similarities and differences between language structures in the world's languages.
- Applied linguistics – finding solutions to real-life problems related to language
  - Computational linguistics – the use of computation applied to language databasing, analysis, translation, and synthesis
  - Forensic linguistics – language science applied to the processes of law and justice
  - Internet linguistics – the study of language usage on the Internet
  - Language assessment – assessing first or second language faculty in individuals
  - Language documentation – comprehensive description of the grammar and use practices of languages of a particular group
  - Language revitalization – an attempt to halt or reverse the decline of a language or to revive an extinct one
  - Language education – teaching specific language and language science
  - Linguistic anthropology – the study of how language influences social life
- Psycholinguistics – the study of the psychological and neurobiological factors that enable humans to acquire, use, comprehend and produce language
  - Cognitive linguistics – an approach which seeks to ground grammar in general cognition
  - Language acquisition – the study of how children and adults acquire language knowledge and ability
  - Language development – the study of early language formation
  - Second-language acquisition – the study of how a second language is learned

==== Subfields, by linguistic structures studied ====
Sub-fields of structure-focused linguistics include:

- Phonetics – the study of the physical properties of speech (or signed) production and perception
- Phonology – the study of sounds (or signs) as discrete, abstract elements in the speaker's mind that distinguish meaning
- Morphology – the study of internal structures of words and how they can be modified
- Syntax – study of how words combine to form grammatical sentences
- Semantics – the study of the meaning of words (lexical semantics) and fixed word combinations (phraseology), and how these compose to form the meanings of sentences
- Pragmatics – the study of how utterances are used in communicative acts – and the role played by context and nonlinguistic knowledge in the transmission of meaning

==== Subfields, by nonlinguistic factors studied ====
- Applied linguistics – the study of language-related issues applied in everyday life, notably language policies, planning, and education. (Constructed language fits under Applied linguistics.)
- Biolinguistics – the study of the biological and evolutionary components of human language
- Clinical linguistics – application of linguistic theory to the field of Speech-Language Pathology
- Computational linguistics – the study of linguistic issues in a way that is 'computationally responsible', i.e., taking careful note of computational consideration of algorithmic specification and computational complexity, so that the linguistic theories devised can be shown to exhibit certain desirable computational properties implementations
- Developmental linguistics – the study of the development of linguistic ability in individuals, particularly the acquisition of language in childhood
- Historical linguistics, or diachronic linguistics – the study of language change over time. Includes archaeolinguistics (or archaeological linguistics), and the dubious field of paleolinguistics.
- Language geography – the study of the geographical distribution of languages and linguistic features
- Neurolinguistics – the study of the structures in the human brain that underlie grammar and communication
- Psycholinguistics – the study of the cognitive processes and representations underlying language use
- Sociolinguistics – the study of variation in language and its relationship with social factors
- Stylistics – the study of linguistic factors that place a discourse in context

=== Other subfields of linguistics ===
- Contrastive linguistics – an approach which seeks to analyze a pair of languages via their similarities and differences
- Corpus linguistics – an empirical linguistic methodology that aims to study language by using large, searchable, annotated databases (corpora)
- Dialectology – the study of language dialects, i.e., subsets of a language
- Discourse analysis – an approach that studies language as it is naturally used and constituted within discourses, with discourses considered generally as semiotic structures
- Grammar – the system of rules and principles governing the composition and usage of a language
- Interlinguistics – the study of auxiliary and planned languages for the facilitation of communication between speakers of different languages and their design
- Language acquisition – process by which an individual acquires their first language (L1)
- Language education – teaching specific language and language science
- Language for specific purposes – the study of language learning in context of highly specific goals and purposes for which the language is learnt, particularly in education and applied linguistcs
- Lexicology – the study of the lexicon of a given language and its structure
- Orthography – sets of conventions for writing a language, including spelling, punctuation, word boundaries, capitalization, hyphenation, and emphasis
- Rhetoric – the study of the techniques by which language can be used to persuade
- Text linguistics – an approach that views texts as communicative systems, particularly focusing on the study of texts as a whole

=== Schools, movements, and approaches of linguistics ===
- Cognitive linguistics
- Danish functional linguistics
- Functionalism
- Generative grammar
- Geneva School
- Interactional linguistics
- Kazan School
- Neogrammarian
- Prague linguistic circle
- Prescription and description
- Soviet linguistics
- Stratificational linguistics
- Structural linguistics
- Systemic functional linguistics
- Tagmemics

== Related fields ==
- Semiotics – the study of the relationship between signs and what they signify more broadly. From the perspective of semiotics, language can be seen as a sign or symbol, with the world as its representation.
- Terminology – the study of terms and their use
  - Terminology science – the study of special vocabulary
- Philosophy of language – takes a philosophical approach to language. Many formal semanticists are philosophers of language, differing from linguist semanticists only in their metaphysical assumptions (if at all).
  - Philosophical logic
  - Topic / Theme
  - Discourse

== History of linguistics ==
=== Timeline of discovery of basic linguistics concepts ===
When were the basic concepts first described and by whom?

- Ancient Sanskrit grammarians
- Ancient Greek study of language
- Roman elaborations of Greek study
- Medieval philosophical work in Latin
- Beginnings of modern linguistics in the 19th century
- Behaviorism and mental tabula rasa hypothesis
- Chomsky and the cognitive revolution
- The Linguistics wars
- Compositional formal semantics arises from the work of Richard Montague and Barbara Partee
- Alternate syntactic systems develop in the 1980s
- Computational linguistics becomes feasible in the late 1980s
- Neurolinguistics and the biological basis of cognition
- Deep learning in the 2010s

== Questions in linguistics ==
1. What is language?
2. How did it/does it evolve?
3. How does language serve as a medium of communication?
4. How does language serve as a medium of thinking?
5. What is common to all languages?
6. How do languages differ?

== Basic concepts ==
What basic concepts / terms do I have to know to talk about linguistics?

- Morphology
  - morpheme, inflection, paradigm, declension, derivation, compound
- Phonology
  - phoneme, allophone, segment, mora, syllable, foot, stress, tone
- Grammar
  - category, tense, aspect, mood and modality, grammatical number, grammatical gender, case
- Syntax
  - phrase, clause, grammatical function, grammatical voice
- Lexicology
  - word, lexeme, lemma, lexicon, vocabulary, terminology
- Semantics
  - meaning, sense, entailment, truth condition, compositionality
- Pragmatics
  - presupposition, implicature, deixis

== Linguistics scholars ==
People who had a significant influence on the development of the field

- J.L. Austin
- Leonard Bloomfield
- Franz Bopp
- Noam Chomsky
- Victoria Fromkin
- Jean Berko Gleason
- Joseph Greenberg
- Paul Grice
- M.A.K. Halliday
- Louis Hjelmslev
- Roman Jakobson
- Sir William Jones
- William Labov
- George Lakoff
- Ronald Langacker
- Richard Montague
- Pāṇini
- Barbara Partee
- Kenneth L. Pike
- Rasmus Rask
- Edward Sapir
- Ferdinand de Saussure
- August Schleicher
- Lucien Tesnière
- Nikolai Trubetzkoy
- Benjamin Lee Whorf

== Linguistics lists ==
- Languages
  - Language families and languages
  - ISO 639
  - Official languages
  - Definitions by language
- Alphabets & Orthography
  - List of writing systems

Arabic	Aramaic	Armenian	Braille	Coptic	Cyrillic
Georgian	Gothic	Korean	Hebrew	IPA	English IPA
Kannada	Hiragana	Katakana	Morse code	ICAO spelling	Phoenician
Runic	SAMPA chart	English SAMPA	Shavian	Thai	

- Ideograms - Chinese and Japanese
- Syllabaries - Korean
- Mixed: Ancient Egyptian
- Common misspellings
- English words without rhymes
- Acronym
  - Wiktionary:Definitions of acronyms and abbreviations

== The placement of linguistics within broader frameworks ==
Linguistics can be described as an academic discipline and, at least in its theoretical subfields, as a field of science, being a widely recognized category of specialized expertise, embodying its own terminology, nomenclature, and scientific journals. Many linguists, such as David Crystal, conceptualize the field as being primarily scientific.

Linguistics is a multi-disciplinary field of research that combines tools from natural sciences, social sciences, formal sciences, and the humanities.

Historically, there has been some lack of consensus on the disciplinary classification of linguistics, particularly theoretical linguistics. Linguistic realists viewed linguistics as a formal science; linguistic nominalists (the American structuralists) viewed linguistics as an empirical or even physical science; linguistic conceptualists viewed linguistics as a branch of psychology and therefore a social science; others yet have argued for viewing linguistics as a mixed science.

Linguistics is heterogeneous in its methods of research, so that each area of theoretical linguistics may resemble methodologically either formal science or empirical science, to different degrees. For example, phonetics uses empirical approaches to study the physical acoustics of spoken language. On the other hand, semantically and grammatically, the usability of a formal or natural language is dependent on a formal and arbitrary axiomatization of rules or norms. Furthermore, as studied in pragmatics and semiotics, linguistic meaning is influenced by social context.

To enable communication by upholding a lexico-semantic norm, the speakers of a shared language need to agree on the meaning of a sequence of phonemes; for instance, "aunt" (/æ/, /n/, /t/) would be acknowledged to signify "parent's sister or parent's sister-in-law", instead of "drummer" or "guest". Likewise, grammatically, it may be necessary for the interlocutors to agree on the morphological and syntactic properties of the sequence; say, that the sequence (/æ/, /n/, /t/) would be treated as a singular noun convertible morphologically to plurality by the addition of the suffix -s, or that as a noun it must not be modified syntactically by an adverb (for instance, "Let's call our immediately aunt" would thus be recognized as a grammatically incoherent structure, in a manner similar to a mathematically undefined expression).

== See also ==
- Number of words in English
- Lexicography
