= Logical form (linguistics) =

Variant of a linguistic expression

In generative grammar and related approaches, the logical form (LF) of a linguistic expression is the variant of its syntactic structure which undergoes semantic interpretation. It is distinguished from phonetic form, the structure which corresponds to a sentence's pronunciation. These separate representations are postulated in order to explain the ways in which an expression's meaning can be partially independent of its pronunciation, e.g. scope ambiguities.

LF is the cornerstone of the classic generative view of the syntax-semantics interface. However, it is not used in Lexical Functional Grammar and Head-Driven Phrase Structure Grammar, as well as some modern variants of the generative approach.

== Syntax interfacing with semantics ==
The notion of Logical Form was originally invented for the purpose of determining quantifier scope. As the theory around the Minimalist program developed, all output conditions, such as theta-criterion, the case filter, Subjacency and binding theory, are examined at the level of LF. The study of LF is more broad than the study of syntax.

=== The notion of scope ===
The scope of an operator is the domain within which it has the ability to affect the interpretation of other expressions. In other words, an operator has scope of operation, or affecting the interpretation of other phrases, only within its own domain. Three uncontroversial examples of scope affecting some aspect of the interpretation are: quantifier-quantifier, quantifier-pronoun, quantifier-negative polarity item.

In instances where a negation has an indefinite article in its scope, the reader's interpretation is affected. The reader is not able to infer the existence of a relevant entity. If negation (or a negation phrase) is within the subject quantifier scope, negation is not affected by the quantifier. If the Quantified Expression1 (QE1) is in the domain of QE2, but not vice versa, QE1 must take a narrow scope; if both are in the domain of the other, the structure is potentially ambiguous. If neither QE is in the domain of the other, they must be interpreted independently. These assumptions explain the cases where the direct object of the main clause is not within the domain of the embedded subject. For example, that every boy left upset a teacher, it cannot be interpreted as for every boy, there is a possibly different teacher who was upset by the fact that the boy left. The only available interpretation is that one single teacher was upset.

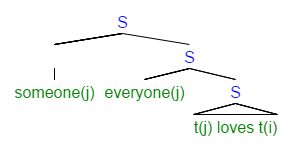
Everyone loves the same someone

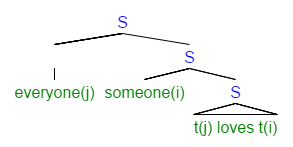
Everyone has someone that they love, not necessarily the same person

=== Ambiguity motivation ===
In syntax, LF exists to give a structural account of certain kinds of semantic ambiguities.

==== Example ====
Everyone loves someone.

This sentence is semantically ambiguous. Specifically, it contains a scope ambiguity. This ambiguity cannot be resolved at surface structure, since someone, being within the verb phrase, must be lower in the structure than everyone. This case exemplifies the general fact that natural language is insufficiently specified for strict logical meaning. Robert May argued for the postulation of LF partly in order to account for such ambiguities (among other motivations). At LF, the sentence above would have two possible structural representations, one for each possible scope-reading, in order to account for the ambiguity by structural differentiation. In this way it is similar in purpose to, but not the same as, logical form in logic.

== Quantification ==
=== Key historical developments ===
There has been discussion about quantification since the 1970s. In 1973, Richard Montague argued that a grammar for a small fragment of English contains the logicosyntactic and semantic devices to handle practically any scope phenomenon. The tool that he mainly relied on is a categorial grammar with functional application; in terms of recent formulations, it can be considered Minimalist syntax with Merge only. However, this approach does not make predictions for some examples with inverse scope (wide scope in object position).

For example, everyone loves someone.

When there is no scope interaction in the relevant portion of the sentence, making either choice shows no difference in semantics.

A short time later, May suggested a different idea. In contrast to Montague, May did not propose any syntax that generates the surface string. He proposed a rule called Quantifier Raising (QR), which explains that movement operations of wh-movement continue to operate on the level of LF, and each phrase continues to possess the quantifier in its domain. May suggested that QR applies to all quantifier phrases with no exception.

The study of Quantification carried on in the 1980s. In contrast to May and Montague, it was suggested that independently motivated phrase structure, such as the relative clause, imposes a limitation on scope options.

This clause boundedness somewhat restricts the QR. May also noticed a subject-object asymmetry with respect to the interaction of wh-words and quantifier phrases. A modified version of his past work that QR determines quantifier scope but does not disambiguate it was brought up. To regulate the interaction, The Scope Principle that if two operators govern each other, they can be interpreted in either scopal order was also brought up. However, this solution has eventually been abandoned.

Alternative analyses have been proposed, since the emergence of Minimalism in the 1990s. This includes attempts to eliminate QR as an operation, and analyze its copal effects as by-products of independent grammatical processes. The other strategy is to modify QR and show it can be fitted into a Minimalist structure.

=== Quantificational noun phrases ===
Danny Fox discusses syntactic positions of QNPs as a way of introducing and illustrating the basic semantic and syntactic relations found in LF. By looking at the meaning of QNPs in relation to the property they are given, or their predicate, we can derive the meaning of the whole sentence.

a. A girl is tall.

b. Many girls are tall.

c. Every girl is tall.

d. No girl is tall.

To understand the Logical Form of these examples, it is important to identify what the basic predicate is and which segments make up the QNPs. In these examples, the predicate is tall and the QNPs are a girl, many girls, every girl and no girl. The logical meaning of these sentences indicates that the property of being tall is attributed to some form of the QNP referring to girl. Along with the QNP and the predicate, there is also an inference of truth value. Either the truth value is True for a person who is tall, or the truth value is False.

Each of the examples above will have different conditions that make the statement true according to the quantifier that precedes girl.

Truth Value conditions:

Example a. A girl has a truth value of true if and only if (iff) at least one girl is tall.
This quantifier is satisfied with 1 instance of a girl being tall.

Example b. Many girls has a truth value of true iff there are many girls who are tall.
This quantifier is satisfied with more than 1 instance of a girl being tall.

Example c. Every girl has a truth value of true iff every girl is tall.
This quantifier requires for all girls, that every instance of a person being female, she must be tall.

Example d. No girl has a truth value of true iff no girl is tall.
This quantifier requires for all girls, that for all instances of a person being female, she must not be tall.

In a syntactic tree, the structure is represented as such: "the argument of a QNP is always the sister of the QNP."

== Wh-movement ==
In linguistics, wh-phrases are operators binding variables at LF, like other quantifier noun phrases. Scope interpretations can be constrained by syntactic constraints as shown in LF when regarding the scope of wh-phrases and quantifiers. When wh-movement is from the subject position it is unambiguous, but when wh-movement is from the object position it is ambiguous.

=== Examples ===
1) What did everyone buy for Max?

[S′ what_{2} [S everyone_{3} [S e_{3} bought e_{2} for max]

(Two possible interpretations: what did everyone

collectively buy, versus individually buy)

2) Who bought everything for Max?

[S′ who_{3} [S everything_{2} [S e_{3} bought e_{2} for max]

(Only one possible interpretation.)

This example demonstrates the effect of the Path Containment Condition (PCC). An A′-path is a line of dominating nodes that go from the trace to a c-commanding A′-binder. If two of the A′ paths intersect then one must be contained in the other. If the paths are overlapping without one being contained in the other, then it is ill-formed. (2)'s paths are overlapping, violating PCC, therefore in order to obtain a grammatical LF structure, everything needs to join the VP. The LF structure then becomes:

LF REPRESENTATION:
[s′ who_{3} [s e_{3} [vp everything_{2} [vp bought e_{2} for max]

== Cross-linguistic examples ==
=== Hungarian ===
Öt orvos minden betegnek kevés új tablettát írt fel.
five doctor every patient-DAT few new pill-ACC wrote up
"There are five doctors x such that for every patient y, x prescribed few new pills to y."

*Öt orvos kevés betegnek minden új tablettát írt fel.
five doctor few patient-DAT every new pill-ACC wrote up
"There are five doctors x such that for some patient y,x prescribed a new pill to y."

In the sentence, "Five doctors prescribed few new pills to every patient.", the scope in Hungarian is largely disambiguated by the linear order of quantifiers on the surface. Two facts that should be kept in mind are (1) the linear order is not obtained by putting quantifiers together in the desired order, which contradicts the predictions made by Montague or May's theory; (2) the linear order is not determined by case or grammatical functions, which supports the prediction of Hornstein's theory.

=== Chinese ===
要是 两个 女人 读过 每本 书。。。
Yàoshi liǎngge nǚrén dúguo měiběn shū...
if two women read+ASP every book
i. "if there are two women who read every book..."
ii. *"if for every book, there are two women who read it..."

要是 两个 线索 被 每个人 找到。。。
Yàoshi liǎngge xiànsuǒ bèi měigerén zhǎodào...
if two clues by everyone found
i. "if there are two clues that are found by everyone..."
ii. "if for everyone, there are two clues she or he finds..."

The significance of A-chains has been emphasized in the Chinese language. Scope in Chinese is disambiguated by case positions in some examples. In this example, the active sentence only has subject wide scope, but the passive sentence is ambiguous. The active sentence only has one interpretation: if there are two women who read every book, which is in the subject wide scope. According to Aoun and Li, Chinese does not have VP-internal subjects, thus, liangge nuren cannot be reconstructed in LF. So the sentence has no ambiguous interpretation. However, the passive sentence has two interpretations, 1. everyone finds the same two clues; 2. everyone finds two clues, while two clues can be different ones. That is because liangge xiansuo is in VP-internal complement position, then in LF, it can be reconstructed. So the passive sentence has two different interpretations.

=== English ===
A boy climbed every tree.
i. A single boy climbed all the trees.
ii.For every tree there is a boy, who may be different for each tree, that climbed tree X.

This phrase is ambiguous in that it can be interpreted as the noun 'boy' referring to a particular individual or to a different individual for each instance of 'tree' under the quantifier 'every'. The interpretation that a single boy climbed all the trees takes a wide scope, while the other interpretation that for every tree there is a boy, who may be different for each tree takes a narrow scope.

== See also ==
- Scope (formal semantics)
- Antecedent-contained deletion
- Categorial grammar
- Government and binding theory (precursor to the minimalist program)
- Logic form

== Bibliography ==
- Aoun, Joseph; Li, Yen-hui Audrey (1993). Syntax of Scope. MIT Press. ISBN 9780262011334.
- Chomsky, Noam (1993). Lectures on government and binding: the Pisa lectures (7th ed.). Berlin: Mouton de Gruyter. ISBN 3110141310.
- Cook, Vivian James; Newson, Mark (2007). Chomsky's Universal Grammar: An Introduction (3rd ed.). Wiley-Blackwell. ISBN 978-1-4051-1186-7.
- Collinge, Neville Edgar (1990). An encyclopedia of language. Routledge. ISBN 9780415020640.
- Corcoran, J. Schemata: the Concept of Schema in the History of Logic. Bulletin of Symbolic Logic 12: 219-40.
- Hanna, Robert (2006). Rationality and logic. MIT Press. pp. 50–51. ISBN 978-0-262-08349-2.
- Hendrick, Randall (2003). Minimalist Syntax. Oxford, UK: Blackwell. ISBN 0-631-21941-2.
- Hornstein, Norbert (1995). Logical form: from GB to minimalism. Blackwell. ISBN 978-0-631-18942-8.
- Ioup, Georgette (1976). "Relexivization: an interpretive approach". Japanese Generative Grammar. Syntax and Semantics. Vol. 5. ISBN 978-90-04-36855-2.
- May, Robert (1985). Logical form: its structure and derivation. MIT Press. pp. 1, 30. ISBN 978-0-262-63102-0.
- Montague, Richard (1973). "The proper treatment of quantification in ordinary English" (PDF). In Thomason, Richmond (ed.). Formal Philosophy: Selected Papers of Richard Montague. Yale University Press.
- Ouhalla, J. (1999). Introducing Transformational Grammar (2 ed.). Arnold Publishers.
- Reinhart, Tanya (1983). "Coreference and Bound Anaphora: A Restatement of the Anaphora Questions". Linguistics and Philosophy. 6 (1): 47–88. doi:10.1007/BF00868090. ISSN 0165-0157. JSTOR 25001118.
- Szabolcsi, Anna (2003). The Handbook of Contemporary Syntactic Theory. Malden, MA.; Oxford, UK : Blackwell Pub. pp. 607, 633. ISBN 1405102535.
- Webelhuth, Gert (1994). Government and Binding Theory. Oxford: Blackwell. pp. 127–175. ISBN 0-631-18059-1.
