= Logical grammar =

Logical grammar or rational grammar is a term used in the history and philosophy of linguistics to refer to certain linguistic and grammatical theories that were prominent until the early 19th century and later influenced 20th-century linguistic thought. These theories were developed by scholars and philosophers who sought to establish a logical and rational basis for understanding the relationship between reality, meaning, cognition, and language. Examples from the classical and modern period represent a realistic approach to linguistics, while accounts written during the Age of Enlightenment represent rationalism, focusing on human thought.

Logical, rational or general grammar was the dominant approach to language until it was supplanted by romanticism. Since then, there have been attempts to revive logical grammar. The idea is today at least partially represented by categorial grammar, formal semantics, and transcendental phenomenology.

== Method and history ==
Logical grammar consists of the analysis of the sentence into a predicate-argument structure and of a commutation test, which breaks the form down paradigmatically into layers of syntactic categories. Through such procedure, formal grammar is extracted from the material. Applying the rules of the grammar produces grammatical sentences, which may be recursive.

=== Subject and predication ===
The foundation of logical grammar was laid out by the Greek philosophers. According to Plato, the task of the sentence is to make a statement about the subject by means of predication. In the Sophist, he uses the example of "Theaetetus is sitting" to illustrate the idea of predication. This statement involves the subject "Theaetetus" and the predicate "is sitting". Plato then examines questions about the relationship between these two elements and the nature of being and non-being.

In the Parmenides, Plato uses examples like "Theaetetus is a man" and "Theaetetus is not a man" to illustrate the complexities and challenges of predication, particularly concerning the relationship between particulars and universal concepts. Plato's discussions of predication in these dialogues are part of his broader exploration of metaphysics, epistemology, and the nature of reality.

After Plato, Aristotle's syllogism relies on the concept of predication, as it forms the basis for his system of deductive reasoning. In Aristotelian syllogism, predication plays a central role in establishing the relationships between different terms within categorical statements. Syllogistic reasoning consists of a series of subjects (S) and predicates (P).

- Premise 1: All humans (S) are mortal (p).
- Premise 2: Socrates (S) is a human (p).
- Conclusion: Therefore, Socrates (S) is mortal (p).

Following these philosophers, the analysis of the sentence into a subject-predicate structure became the cornerstone of classical grammar. Building on the Greek classics, Thomas of Erfurt's 14th-century Latin grammar expounds the role of linguistics within natural sciences. The task of language is to make statements concerning reality by means of predication. Erfurt's Modistae grammar also includes a transitive sentence. In his example "Plato strikes Socrates," Plato is the subject and "strikes Socrates" is the predicate relating to Plato.

More examples of predication are found in the rational grammars of the Age of Enlightenment, such as the Port-Royal grammar. This approach is also elaborated by Edmund Husserl in the second edition of his Logical Investigations (1921). Husserl's phenomenological 'pure logical grammar' entails the study of the interconnectedness of language and the structures of consciousness. It influenced Rudolph Carnap's 1935 logical syntax, which later formed the basis of categorial grammar. Such logical concepts of language, constructed by mathematicians and philosophers, represent the first approaches to generative grammar. However, linguists adopted the technique and replaced the logical and rational concepts with biologism and psychologism.

In the 20th century, the subject-centered view was supplanted in mathematical logic by predicate-argument structure, which focuses on the event (cf. predicate) and the relationship between the arguments, whose number is in principle unlimited: P(x,y,...). In modern linguistics, the mechanism familiar from classical predication often goes under the name of information structure but is considered part of innate syntax in generative grammar. Formal semantics, as well as dependency grammar, employs transitive or n-ary predicates, but categorial grammar remains based on the unary predicate. Predicate-argument structure has been proposed for phenomenological linguistics, but such an enterprise is yet to materialize.

=== Categories and substitution ===
The first philosopher to extensively discuss categories (or "predicables") in Western philosophy was Aristotle. In his work "Categories" (also known as "Categories of Being"), Aristotle systematically examined different types of predicables or categories, which are fundamental concepts for understanding the nature of reality and how language represents it. These include ten basic types that he identified as fundamental for understanding and classifying things in the world.

- substances (individual entities like humans or animals),
- quantities (measurements of size, number, etc.),
- qualities (attributes or characteristics such as color or shape),
- relations (ways things are related to one another),
- places (locations or positions),
- times (temporal references),
- situations (conditions or states of affairs),
- conditions (circumstances or modes of being),
- actions (what things do), and
- passions (what happens to things).

The concept of syntactic categories, also known as parts of speech or word classes (e.g., nouns, verbs, adjectives, adverbs etc.), is related to but separable from the categories of being in the study of Ancient Greek grammar. Dionysius Thrax's work "Art of Grammar" is one of the earliest systematic grammatical treatises in Western tradition. Thrax classified words into eight parts of speech:

- noun and pronoun (cf. substances),
- verb (cf. actions and passions),
- adjective (cf. qualities),
- adverb (cf. places, times, situations and conditions),
- preposition and conjunction (cf. relations), and
- interjection.

The substitution of one element with another of the same syntactic category is discussed in the general and rational grammar of Port-Royal (1660) and elaborated by Husserl in his Logical Investigations, which introduces the commutation test (see also constituent test), which is based on such substitution. The identification of the elements belonging to a category is based on their grammaticality. For example, the adjective white in the statement 'This paper is white' is substituted by another adjective such as green or careless. In Husserl's taxonomy, a statement like 'This paper is careless' has a structured meaning but is "nonsense". By contrast, the statement 'This careless is green' violates the laws of structured meaning and is therefore "senseless". In modern terminology, the first statement is grammatical but the second one is ungrammatical.

From another angle, pure logical grammar constitutes phrases, which represent a higher-level syntactic category, employing predication. The underlying logical proposition 'This paper is white' is transformed into the adjective phrase white paper. The whole sentence is constituted according to the principle of predication; and phrases are identified by means of substitution.

This insight led to the development of categorial and type logical grammar. Sentences, whether acquired via empirical or introspective inquiry, are analyzed and synthesized into different-level syntactic categories to build a formal grammar. When the acquired rewrite rules are employed in reverse (i.e. starting from the sentence level and proceeding to clauses, phrases, single elements and terminals), the grammar generates all the grammatical sentences of the language, and an unrestricted (or "infinite") number of sentences.

== Criticism ==
In general linguistics, logical and rational grammar was supplanted by romanticism in the beginning of the 19th century. One prominent figure who critiqued Enlightenment grammar during the Romantic era was Friedrich Schlegel. In his work Über die Sprache und Weisheit der Indier ('On the Language and Wisdom of the Indians'), Schlegel advocated for a more flexible and organic approach to language. He argued that language should be seen as a living and evolving entity, rather than a fixed set of rules.

Another key figure was Novalis (Friedrich von Hardenberg), who expressed the idea that language was a dynamic and creative force, and that it should reflect the richness of human experience and emotions. Novalis wrote about the importance of poetic language and the need for language to capture the depths of the soul. However, the most influential figure in linguistic romanticism was Wilhelm von Humboldt, who argued that all languages have their own logic, or 'inner form,' rather than all languages being based on universal logic.

Romanticism followed a time period when language education became politicized as education became accessible to a larger demographic, and language standardization became influenced by nationalism. Discussing language and authority from a modern and historical viewpoint, James Milroy and Lesley Milroy argue that logical explanations (alongside mathematical, functional and aesthetic considerations) of linguistic phenomena have no place in descriptive linguistics, which has the purpose of helping linguists guide the education authorities to more scientifically grounded policies. According to Milroy and Milroy, more appropriate theories for the purpose include those proposed by Ferdinand de Saussure, Noam Chomsky, and David Crystal. Modern theorists including Chomsky and George Lakoff have counteracted contemporary efforts to revive logicism in linguistics, especially the Montague grammar and formal semantics.
