= Semantic ambiguity =

Linguistic concept

In linguistics, an expression is semantically ambiguous when it can have multiple meanings. The higher the number of synonyms a word has, the higher the degree of ambiguity. Like other kinds of ambiguity, semantic ambiguities are often clarified by context or by prosody. One's comprehension of a sentence in which a semantically ambiguous word is used is strongly influenced by the general structure of the sentence. The language itself is sometimes a contributing factor in the overall effect of semantic ambiguity, in the sense that the level of ambiguity in the context can change depending on whether or not a language boundary is crossed.

Lexical ambiguity is a subtype of semantic ambiguity where a word or morpheme is ambiguous. When a lexical ambiguity results from a single word having two senses, it is called polysemy. For instance, the English "foot" is polysemous since in general it refers to the base of an object, but can refer more specifically to the foot of a person or the foot of a pot. When an ambiguity instead results from two separate words which happen to be pronounced the same way, it is called homonymy. For instance, the English word "row" can denote the action of rowing or to an arrangement of objects. In practice, polysemy and homonymy can be difficult to distinguish.

Phrases and sentences can also be semantically ambiguous, particularly when there are multiple ways of semantically combining its subparts. For instance, the English sentence "Everybody isn't here" is ambiguous between an interpretation where not everybody is here and another interpretation where nobody is. This ambiguity is an example of scope ambiguity, a phenomenon widely studied in formal semantics. De re/de dicto ambiguity is another notable example of sentence-level ambiguity which has received much attention in linguistics and philosophy. In some analyses, such ambiguities are the semantic reflexes of syntactic ambiguities, though in other approaches they are not.

The meaning of a semantically ambiguous sentence is not necessarily equivalent to the logical disjunction of all of its possible meanings.
