= Syntax–semantics interface =

Interaction between syntax and semantics

In linguistics, the syntax–semantics interface is the interaction between syntax and semantics. Its study encompasses phenomena that pertain to both syntax and semantics, with the goal of explaining correlations between form and meaning. Specific topics include scope, binding, and lexical semantic properties such as verbal aspect and nominal individuation, semantic macroroles, and unaccusativity.

The interface is conceived of very differently in formalist and functionalist approaches. While functionalists tend to look into semantics and pragmatics for explanations of syntactic phenomena, formalists try to limit such explanations within syntax itself. Aside from syntax, other aspects of grammar have been studied in terms of how they interact with semantics; which can be observed by the existence of terms such as morphosyntax–semantics interface.

== Functionalist approaches ==
Within functionalist approaches, research on the syntax–semantics interface has been aimed at disproving the formalist argument of the autonomy of syntax, by finding instances of semantically determined syntactic structures.

Levin and Rappaport Hovav, in their 1995 monograph, reiterated that there are some aspects of verb meaning that are relevant to syntax, and others that are not, as previously noted by Steven Pinker. Levin and Rappaport Hovav isolated such aspects focusing on the phenomenon of unaccusativity that is "semantically determined and syntactically encoded".

Van Valin and LaPolla, in their 1997 monographic study, found that the more semantically motivated or driven a syntactic phenomenon is, the more it tends to be typologically universal, that is, to show less cross-linguistic variation.

== Formal approaches ==
In formal semantics, semantic interpretation is viewed as a mapping from syntactic structures to denotations. There are several formal views of the syntax–semantics interface which differ in what they take to be the inputs and outputs of this mapping. In the Heim and Kratzer model commonly adopted within generative linguistics, the input is taken to be a special level of syntactic representation called logical form. At logical form, semantic relationships such as scope and binding are represented unambiguously, having been determined by syntactic operations such as quantifier raising. Other formal frameworks take the opposite approach, assuming that such relationships are established by the rules of semantic interpretation themselves. In such systems, the rules include mechanisms such as type shifting and dynamic binding.

== History ==
Before the 1950s, there was no discussion of a syntax–semantics interface in American linguistics, since neither syntax nor semantics was an active area of research. This neglect was due in part to the influence of logical positivism and behaviorism in psychology, that viewed hypotheses about linguistic meaning as untestable.

By the 1960s, syntax had become a major area of study, and some researchers began examining semantics as well. In this period, the most prominent view of the interface was the Katz–Postal Hypothesis according to which deep structure was the level of syntactic representation which underwent semantic interpretation. This assumption was upended by data involving quantifiers, which showed that syntactic transformations can affect meaning. During the linguistics wars, a variety of competing notions of the interface were developed, many of which live on in present-day work.

== See also ==
- Active–stative alignment
- Antecedent-contained deletion
- Coercion (linguistics)
- Colorless green ideas sleep furiously
- Compositionality
- David Dowty
- Form–meaning mismatch
- Morphosyntactic alignment
- Role and reference grammar
- Selection (linguistics)
- Semantic class
- Semantic feature
- Semantic primes
- Semantic property
- Shifting (syntax)
- Split intransitivity
- Thematic relation
- Type shifter
