= Formal Semantics in Moscow =

Academic conference based in Moscow, Russia

Formal Semantics in Moscow (FSiM) is an annual academic conference devoted to the formal semantics and pragmatics of natural language.

== See also ==
- Lomonosov Moscow State University

== Bibliography ==
- Partee, Barbara H. (2005). "Report from the First FSIM Workshop: Formal Semantics in Moscow, April 2005".
