= FSIM =

FSIM is an acronym for:

- Formal Semantics in Moscow, an academic conference.
- Fox Sports Interactive Media, the online media subsidiary of Fox Corporation's Fox Sports Media Group.

FSIM is also a filename extension for a file format in Windows

- Simulation File Format, used by Loudsoft.
