= Antecedent-contained deletion =

Linguistic phenomenon

Antecedent-contained deletion (ACD), also called antecedent-contained ellipsis, is a phenomenon whereby an elided verb phrase appears to be contained within its own antecedent. For instance, in the sentence "I read every book that you did", the verb phrase in the main clause appears to license ellipsis inside the relative clause which modifies its object. ACD is a classic puzzle for theories of the syntax-semantics interface, since it threatens to introduce an infinite regress. It is commonly taken as motivation for syntactic transformations such as quantifier raising, though some approaches explain it using semantic composition rules or by adopting more flexible notions of what it means to be a syntactic unit.

== Movement-based analyses ==
To understand the issue, it is necessary to understand how VP-ellipsis works. Consider the following examples, where the expected but elided VP is represented with a smaller font and subscripts and the antecedent to the ellipsis is in bold:

John washed the dishes, and Mary did _{wash the dishes}, too.
John washed the dishes on Tuesday, and Mary did _{wash the dishes on Tuesday}, too.

In each of these sentences, the VP has been elided in the second half, and the elided VP should be essentially identical to the antecedent in the first clause. That is, the missing VP in the first sentence can mean only wash the dishes, and in the second sentence, the missing VP can mean only wash the dishes on Tuesday. Assuming the missing VP must be essentially identical to an antecedent VP leads to a problem, first noticed by Bouton (1970):

John read every book that Mary did _{read every book that Mary did read every book that Mary did read every book etc.}.

Since the elided VP must be essentially identical to its antecedent, and assuming that the antecedent is a full VP, an infinite regress occurs (the subscripted text). That is, if we substitute the antecedent VP into the position of the ellipsis, we must repeat the substitution process ad infinitum. The difficulty is further illustrated with the tree for the sentence:

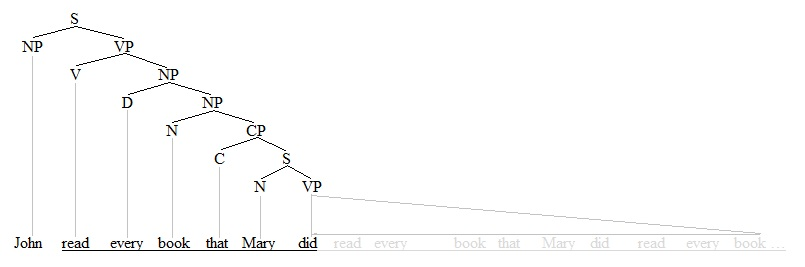

The light grey font indicates the elided constituent, i.e. the ellipsis, and the underline marks the antecedent constituent to the ellipsis. Since the antecedent constituent contains the ellipsis itself, resolution of the ellipsis necessitates an infinite regress as the antecedent is substituted ad infinitum into the ellipsis site. To avoid this problem, Sag (1976) proposed that the NP every book that Mary did undergoes quantifier raising (QR) to a position above the verb.

[every book that Mary did...]_{i} John read t_{i}.

Now the reference for the elided VP is simply the following:

read t_{i}

The analysis can now assume that the elided VP in the example corresponds to just read, since after QR, the antecedent VP no longer contains the object raised NP:

[every book that Mary did _{read}] John read.

The infinite regress is now avoided because after QR, the antecedent VP contains just the verb read.

== See also ==
- Verb phrase ellipsis
- Ellipsis (linguistics)
- Logical form (linguistics)
- Constituent (linguistics)
- Pseudogapping
- Phrase structure grammar
- Dependency grammar
