= Aifric Campbell =

Irish writer

Aifric Campbell is an Irish writer. Her novel On the Floor has been longlisted for the Orange Prize. Her writing has appeared in The Irish Times, The Guardian, Daily Telegraph, Tatler, ELLE, and Sunday Business Post.

== Biography ==
Campbell attended a convent school in Dublin. While still a young girl she was the owner of Táin Mór, which won the Irish Greyhound Derby in 1976. She worked as an au pair in Sweden, where she graduated from the University of Gothenburg in Linguistics.

She worked as an investment banker at Morgan Stanley for 13 years, where she became the first female managing director of a trading team, an experience which inspired her novel On the Floor.

She studied psychotherapy and creative writing, at the University of East Anglia. She lives in Sussex with her husband and her son.

== Bibliography ==
- The Semantics of Murder, Serpent's Tail, 2008, ISBN 978-1-85242-996-6. A novel inspired by the unsolved murder of Richard Montague.
- The Loss Adjustor (2010). A novel about a woman working as a loss adjustor in London while dealing with her own personal loss.
- On the Floor (2013). A novel about a woman working as an investment banker in early 1990s London.
- "Larry, Lay Down" included in the anthology New Irish Short Stories, edited by Joseph O'Connor (2011)

== Film ==
Campbell wrote the voice-over script for the film C.K., directed by Barbara Visser.
