= Nino Cocchiarella =

American philosopher (born 1933)

Nino Cocchiarella (1933 - 2026) is an American philosopher who is Professor Emeritus of Philosophy at Indiana University Bloomington. He is best known for his work in formal logic and ontology.

Among his important articles are:

- "Nominalism and Conceptualism as Predicative Second Order Theories of Predication", Notre Dame Journal of Formal Logic, vol. 21 (1980)
- "Richard Montague and the Logical Analysis of Language", in Contemporary Philosophy: A New Survey, vol. 2, Philosophy of Language/Philosophical Logic, G. Fløistad, ed., Martinus Nijhoff, The Hague (1981)
- "The Development of the Theory of Logical Types and the Notion of a Logical Subject in Russell's Early Philosophy", Synthese, vol. 45 (1980).

His books include Logical Investigations of Predication Theory and the Problem of Universals (1986); Logical Studies in Early Analytic Philosophy (1987); Formal Ontology and Conceptual Realism, New York, Springer (2007); and Modal Logic. An Introduction to its Syntax and Semantics (with Max Freund), Oxford, Oxford University Press (2008).
