= Autonomy of syntax =

Term in linguistics

In linguistics, the autonomy of syntax is the assumption that syntax is arbitrary and self-contained with respect to meaning: semantics, pragmatics, discourse function, and other factors external to language. The autonomy of syntax is advocated by linguistic formalists, and in particular by generative linguistics, whose approaches have hence been called autonomist linguistics.

The autonomy of syntax is at the center of the debates between formalist and functionalist linguistics, and since the 1980s research has been conducted on the syntax–semantics interface within functionalist approaches, aimed at finding instances of semantically determined syntactic structures, to disprove the formalist argument of the autonomy of syntax.

The principle of iconicity is contrasted, for some scenarios, with that of the autonomy of syntax. The weaker version of the argument for the autonomy of syntax (or that for the autonomy of grammar), includes only for the principle of arbitrariness, while the stronger version includes the claim of self-containedness. The principle of arbitrariness of syntax is actually accepted by most functionalist linguists, and the real dispute between functionalist and generativists is on the claim of self-containedness of grammar or syntax.

== History ==
The assumption of the autonomy of syntax can be traced back to the neglect of the study of semantics by American structuralists like Leonard Bloomfield and Zellig Harris in the 1940s, which was based on a neo-positivist anti-psychologist stance, according to which since it is presumably impossible to study how the brain works, linguists should ignore all cognitive and psychological aspects of language and focus on the only objective data, that is how language appears in its exterior form. This paralleled the distinction between the two approaches in psychology, behaviorism, which was the dominant approach up until the 1940s, and cognitivism.

Over the decades, multiple instances have been found of cases in which syntactic structures are actually determined or influenced by semantic traits, and some formalists and generativists have reacted to that by shrinking those parts of semantics that they consider autonomous. Over the decades, in the changes that Noam Chomsky has made to his generative formulation, there has been a shift from a claim for the autonomy of syntax to one for the autonomy of grammar.

== Functionalist linguistics vs. formalist linguistics ==
The assumption of the autonomy of syntax has been a highly controversial topic in the functionalist and formalist linguistic spheres. Linguistic functionalists make the argument that semantics play a role in syntax, while linguistic formalists agree that semantics and syntax interact, but they are not affected on each other. A common example that is used by linguistic formalists to indicate the validity of autonomy in syntax is, "Colorless green ideas sleep furiously", which demonstrates that, in order for a sentence to be syntactically correct, it does not need to be coherent or meaningful in any way.

Various grammar models have been developed both supporting and rejecting the autonomy of syntax. The main grammatical model that is in support of the Autonomy of Syntax is Generative Grammar, created by Noam Chomsky. On the other hand, examples of models that argue against it are Construction Grammar, Head-driven Phase Structure Grammar, and Generalized Phase Structure Grammar.

== See also ==
- Linguistic wars
- Grammaticalization
- Self-contained system (software)
