= Scope (formal semantics) =

Semantic object to which an operator applies

In formal semantics, the scope of a semantic operator is the semantic object to which it applies. For instance, in the sentence "Paulina doesn't drink beer but she does drink wine," the proposition that Paulina drinks beer occurs within the scope of negation, but the proposition that Paulina drinks wine does not. Scope can be thought of as the semantic order of operations.

One of the major concerns of research in formal semantics is the relationship between operators' syntactic positions and their semantic scope. This relationship is not transparent, since the scope of an operator need not directly correspond to its surface position and a single surface form can be semantically ambiguous between different scope construals. Some theories of scope posit a level of syntactic structure called logical form, in which an item's syntactic position corresponds to its semantic scope. Other theories compute scope relations in the semantics itself, using formal tools such as type shifters, monads, and continuations.

== Phenomena ==
=== Scope ambiguity ===
The scope of an operator need not correspond directly to the word order of the sentence it occurs in. For instance, some sentences display a scope ambiguity in that the relative scopes of two operators can be construed in multiple ways.

1. Every hedgehog is friends with a giraffe.

This sentence can be understood in two ways. On the inverse scope reading, there is a single giraffe who is very popular in the hedgehog community. On the surface scope reading, the sentence can be true even if the hedgehogs are friends with different giraffes.

=== Split scope ===
Split scope is the phenomenon where different components of an expressions item's meaning take scope in different places. Negative quantifiers are one category of expression which have been argued to take split scope.

1. The company need fire no employees.

On the de re (non-split) reading, this sentence means that there is no employee such that the company needs to fire that employee. This is a non-split scope reading since "no" simply takes scope above the modal "need". On the split scope reading of this sentence, it means that it is not the case that the company needs to fire any employees. On this reading, "no" decomposes into a negation scoping above "need" and an existential quantifier scoping below it.

Indefinites have been argued to have split scope, having separate existential scope and distributive scope. This fact can be seen in the following example:

1. If three relatives of mine die, I will inherit a house.

Among this sentence's reading is one which means "There exists a set of three relatives such that, if those three relatives die, I will inherit a house." On this reading, the indefinite "three relatives of mine" takes existential scope outside the conditional–– it asserts unconditionally that those three relatives do in fact exist. However, if the indefinite takes distributive scope inside the conditional–– the speaker will inherit a house if three relatives die, not if x dies where x can be any of those three relatives.

Definite descriptions have also been argued to have split scope. Definites are classically considered to presuppose that their referents are unique. For instance, the definite description "the cat" is infelicitous in a context where there are multiple cats which the speaker could have in mind. However, this generalization seems to be contradicted by Haddock descriptions such as the following:

1. Context: In front of the speaker are numerous hats, one of which contains a rabbit.
  Haddock description: The rabbit in the hat

This noun phrase is felicitous to use in this context, even though there is no unique hat. What seems to license this surprising use of the definite description is the fact that the context contains a unique rabbit-containing hat. To cash out this idea, it has been proposed that the uniqueness presupposition of "the hat" takes scope separately from the rest of the definite's meaning. In other words, a witness set is established low in the structure, but is checked for singletonness higher up.

=== Scope islands ===
While operators can often take scope above their surface position, there are not entirely free to take scope wherever they want. For instance, as illustrated by Sentence 1 below, quantifiers that originate inside an if-clause usually cannot take scope outside of that "if"-clause. This sentence cannot mean that Beth will inherit one house for each dead relative.

1. If every relative of mine dies, I will inherit a house.

This fact parallels the fact that a wh-phrase cannot be extracted from an "if"-clause, as shown in Sentence 2.

1. Which relative_{i} will you inherit a fortune if t_{i} dies?

Examples of this sort have been used to argue that scope relations are determined by syntactic movement operations.

Aside from their theoretical significance, scope islands are also practically useful since they can be used to construct unambiguous paraphrases of sentences with scope ambiguities.

=== Exceptional scope ===
While most operators are unable to scope out of an island, others can. For instance, the indefinite "a" in the sentence below can take scope outside of its surface position inside an "if"-clause. This sentence can mean that there is a particular relative who must die for the speaker to get a house.

1. If a relative of mine dies, I will inherit a house.

Examples of this sort have been used to argue that indefinites do not have standard generalized quantifier denotations. On the choice function approach proposed by Tanya Reinhart, indefinites contribute a variable over choice functions which can be existentially closed at any point higher in the structure. Angelika Kratzer proposed another choice function-based theory, which is similar to Reinhart's except that the choice function variable is left free. Recent work such as Charlow (2020) treats indefinites as denoting sets of individuals which can be type shifted so that they take scope in a manner similar to Karttunen's (1977) alternative-based mechanism for wh-questions.

== Formal approaches to scope ==
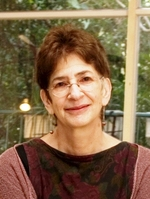
Tanya Reinhart pioneered the structural approach to scope.

The structural view of scope is one influential view which posits a close relationship between syntax and semantics. This approach is characterized by the following hypothesis, first formulated by Tanya Reinhart:

Hypothesis about scope and domain: The semantic scope of an operator corresponds to the position of the item which expresses it at some level of syntactic representation.

This view is widely adopted in generative approaches such as that of Heim and Kratzer (1998). In these approaches, the relevant syntactic level is logical form and the syntactic notion which corresponds to semantic scope is typically identified as c-command.

In structural approaches, discrepancies between an expression's surface position and its semantic scope are explained by syntactic movement operations such as quantifier raising. The movement approach is motivated in large part by the fact that quantifier scope seems to obey many of the same restrictions that movement does, e.g. islands.

One prominent alternative to the structural view is the type shifting view first proposed by Barbara Partee and Mats Rooth. This approach uses type shifters to govern scopal relations. Since type shifters are applied during the process of semantic interpretation, this approach allows scopal relations to be partly independent of syntactic structure. The type shifting approach serves as the basis of many recent proposals for exceptional scope, split scope, and other troublesome scope-related phenomena.

== See also ==
- Continuation-passing style
- De dicto and de re
- Generalized quantifier
- Logical form (linguistics)
- Quantifier (linguistics)
- Type shifter
