= Pauline Jacobson =

American linguist

Pauline (Polly) Jacobson
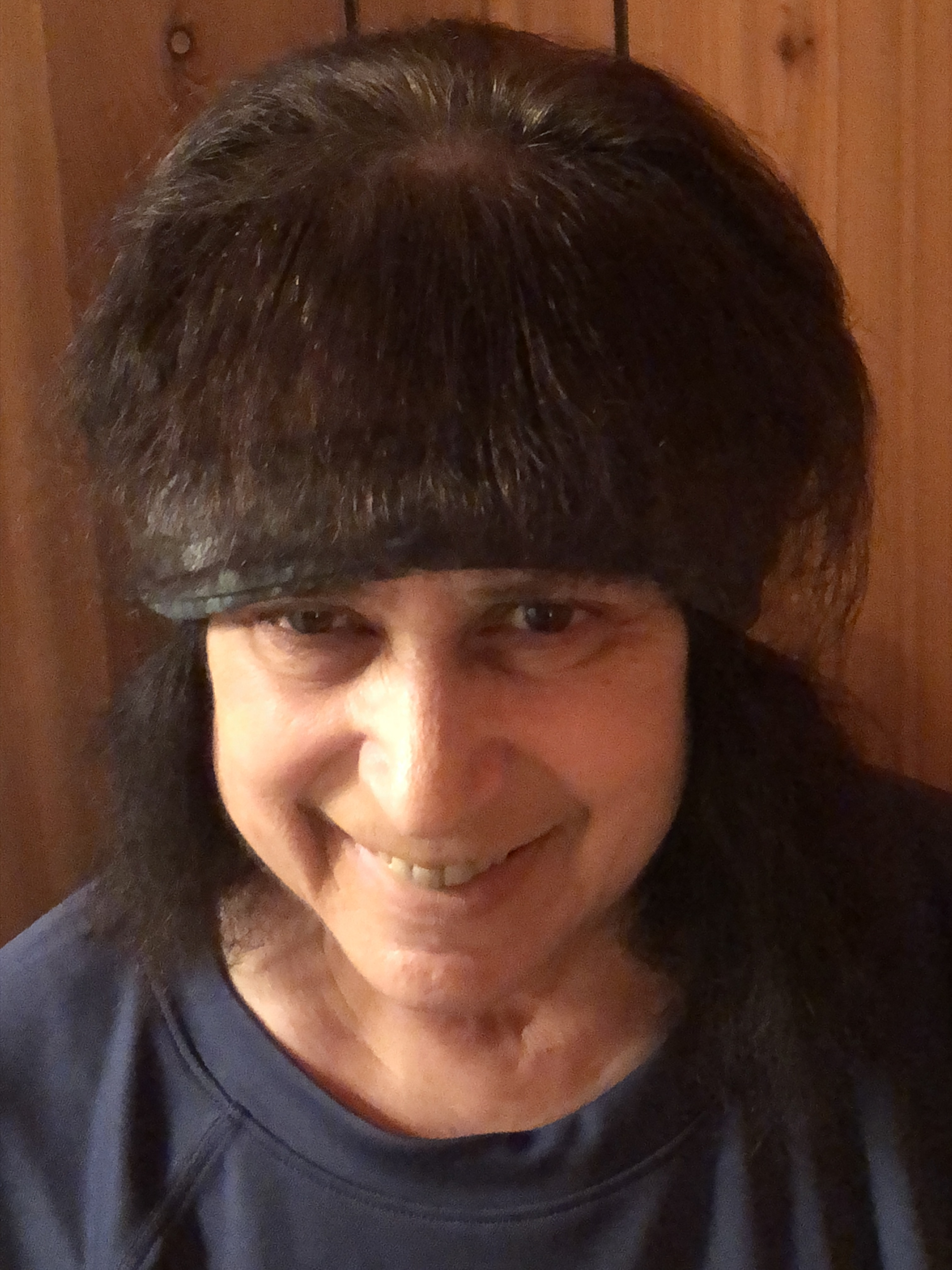
- Born: 9 July 1947 (age 79); Chicago, Illinois, US
- Education: University of California, Berkeley
- Scientific career
- Fields: Semantics & Linguistics
- Workplaces: Brown University

Pauline (Polly) Jacobson is a professor of Linguistics at Brown University, where she has been since 1977. She is known for her work on variable free semantics, direct compositionality, and transderivationality.

== Education ==
She completed her Ph.D in Linguistics at the University of California, Berkeley in 1977. Her Thesis was entitled The Syntax of Crossing Coreference Sentences. She completed her A.B. in Anthropology at the University of California, Berkeley in 1968.

== Honors ==
She has regularly taught at the summer institutes of the Linguistic Society of America and at the European Summer School in Logic, Language and Information (ESSLLI).

In 2022, Jacobson was inducted as a Fellow of the Linguistic Society of America.

== Selected publications ==
- Jacobson, Pauline. 1999. "Towards a Variable-Free Semantics", Linguistics and Philosophy, 22, 117-184.
- Jacobson, Pauline. 1995. "On the Quantificational Force of English Free Relatives". in E. Bach, E. Jelinek, A. Kratzer, and B. Partee (eds.), Quantification in Natural Languages, pp. 451–486. Kluwer Academic Publishers, Dordrecht. ISBN 978-0792333524.
- Jacobson, Pauline. 2000. "Paycheck pronouns, Bach-Peters sentences, and variable-free semantics". Natural Language Semantics, 8, 77-155.
- Jacobson, Pauline. "Raising as Function Composition". 1990. Linguistics and Philosophy, 13, 423-475.
- Jacobson, Pauline and Geoffrey K. Pullum. 1982. The Nature of Syntactic Representation. Springer.
