= Barbara H. Partee =

American linguist (born 1940)

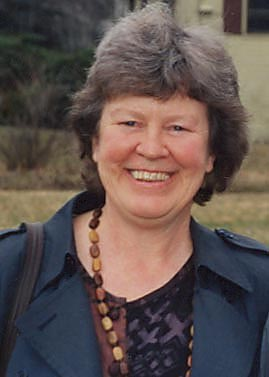
- Born: Barbara Hall Partee; June 23, 1940 (age 86); Englewood, New Jersey, U.S.
- Education: Swarthmore College (BA); Massachusetts Institute of Technology (PhD)
- Scientific career
- Fields: Linguistics
- Workplaces: University of California, Los Angeles; University of Massachusetts Amherst
- Thesis: Subject and Object in Modern English (1965)
- Doctoral advisor: Noam Chomsky
- Notable students: Edward N. Zalta

Barbara Hall Partee (born June 23, 1940) is an American linguist and Distinguished University Professor Emerita of Linguistics and Philosophy at the University of Massachusetts Amherst (UMass). She is known as a pioneer in the field of formal semantics.

== Biography ==
Born in Englewood, New Jersey, Partee grew up in the Baltimore area. She attended Swarthmore College, where she majored in mathematics with minors in Russian and philosophy, graduating with a Bachelor of Arts in 1961. She did her graduate work at the Massachusetts Institute of Technology under Noam Chomsky. Her 1965 PhD dissertation from MIT was entitled Subject and Object in Modern English.

Partee began her professorial career at the University of California, Los Angeles in 1965 as an assistant professor of linguistics. She taught there until 1972, when she transferred to the University of Massachusetts Amherst, soon becoming a full professor. During her time at UMass Amherst, she has taught numerous students who would become notable linguists including Gennaro Chierchia and Irene Heim. She retired from UMass in September 2004. Her other notable students include Laurence Horn.

Through her interactions with the philosopher and logician Richard Montague at UCLA in the 1970s she played an important role in bringing together the research traditions of generative linguistics, formal logic, and analytic philosophy, pursuing an agenda pioneered by David Lewis in his 1970 article "General Semantics". She helped popularize Montague grammar among linguists in the United States, especially at a time when there was a lot of uncertainty about the relation between syntax and semantics.

She is one of the founders of contemporary formal semantics in the United States, the author of a number of influential works. In her later years she has become increasingly interested in a new kind of intellectual synthesis, forging connections to the tradition of lexical semantic research as it has long been practiced in Russia.

She is the younger sister of professional baseball player Dick Hall, a major-league outfielder and pitcher and member of the Baltimore Orioles' Hall of Fame, who was also a Swarthmore graduate.

== Awards and distinctions ==
Partee has received various honors, including the presidency of the Linguistic Society of America (1986), honorary doctorates from Swarthmore College (1989), Charles University in Prague (1992), Copenhagen Business School (2005) and University of Chicago (2014), and election to the American Academy of Arts and Sciences (1984) and the United States National Academy of Sciences (1989). In 1992, she received the Max-Planck-Forschungspreis (research award of the Max Planck Society; together with Hans Kamp). She has been a foreign member of the Royal Netherlands Academy of Arts and Sciences since 2002. In 2006, she was inducted as a Fellow of the Linguistic Society of America. On January 8, 2018 she received an honorary doctorate from the University of Amsterdam for her pioneering work in formal semantics. In July 2018 she was elected a Corresponding Fellow of the British Academy. In 2020 she received the Benjamin Franklin Medal (Franklin Institute).

She was a founding co-editor of the Annual Review of Linguistics in 2015.

== See also ==
- Grammatical tense
- Lambda calculus
- Montague grammar
- Subsective adjective
- Temperature paradox

== Bibliography ==
- Partee, Barbara (1978), Fundamentals of Mathematics for Linguistics, Dordrecht: Springer, ISBN 978-9-02770-809-0.
- Stockwell, Robert P & Schachter, Paul & Partee, Barbara Hall. 1973. The major syntactic structures of English. New York: Holt, Rinehart and Winston. [Original unabridged 1968 version: Integration of transformational theories on English syntax. Bedford, MA: ESD.]
