= Quantifier (linguistics) =

Type of determiner that indicates quantity

In linguistics and grammar, a quantifier is a type of determiner, such as all, some, many, few, a lot, and no, (but not specific numerals) that indicates quantity.

Quantification is also used in logic, where it is a formula constructor that produces new formulas from old ones. Natural languages' determiners have been argued to correspond to logical quantifiers at the semantic level.

== Introduction ==
All known human languages make use of quantification (Wiese 2004). For example, in English:

- Every glass in my recent order was chipped.
- Some of the people standing across the river have white armbands.
- Most of the people I talked to didn't have a clue who the candidates were.
- A lot of people are smart.

The words in italics are quantifiers. There exists no simple way of reformulating any one of these expressions as a conjunction or disjunction of sentences, each a simple predicate of an individual such as That wine glass was chipped. These examples also suggest that the construction of quantified expressions in natural language can be syntactically very complicated. For mathematical assertions, the quantification process is syntactically more straightforward.

The study of quantification in natural languages is much more difficult than the corresponding problem for formal languages. This comes in part from the fact that the grammatical structure of natural language sentences may conceal the logical structure. Moreover, mathematical conventions strictly specify the range of validity for formal language quantifiers; for natural language, specifying the range of validity requires dealing with non-trivial semantic problems. This difficulty (along with his logicist program in the philosophy of mathematics) inspired Gottlob Frege to create his theories of quantification for language.

Montague grammar gives a novel formal semantics of natural languages. Its proponents argue that it provides a much more natural formal rendering of natural language than the traditional treatments of Frege, Russell and Quine.

== Order of quantifiers and ambiguity ==
The order of quantifiers is critical to meaning. While mathematical formal notation requires writing quantifiers in front, thus avoiding ambiguity, problems arise in natural (or mixed) language when quantifiers are also appended:

- "∃A: ∀B: C" – unambiguous
- "there is an A such that ∀B: C" – unambiguous
- "there is an A such that for all B, C" – unambiguous, provided that the separation between B and C is clear
- "there is an A such that C for all B" – it is often clear that what is meant is

"there is an A such that (C for all B)", formally: "∃A: ∀B: C"

but it could be interpreted as

"(there is an A such that C) for all B", formally: "∀B: ∃A: C"

- "there is an A such that C ∀B" — suggests more strongly that the first is meant; this may be reinforced by the layout, for example by putting "C ∀B" on a new line.

== History ==
Term logic, also called Aristotelian logic, treats quantification in a manner that is closer to natural language, and also less suited to formal analysis. Term logic treated All, Some and No in the 4th century BC, in an account also touching on the alethic modalities. Starting with Gottlob Frege's 1879 Begriffsschrift, Charles Sanders Peirce's 1885 work, and Bertrand Russell's 1903 Principles of Mathematics, quantifiers were introduced into mathematical logic formalism. See Quantifier (logic) § History for details.

While Frege was developing his theory of quantifiers, he noticed that sentences in natural languages able to be constructed and analyzed in a "hierarchical" and "stage-like" manner. Because of this, he introduced his quantifier notation in order to study natural language. In particular, many sentences' forms are able to be abstracted using quantifiers and variables. It provides a good explanation for as to why our understanding of, say, "Bob runs" also allows us to intuitively understand the sentence, "Mark runs" (both have the same logical form).

== See also ==
- Generalized quantifier—the standard semantics assigned to determiner phrases
- Indefinite pronoun
- Number names
- Polarity item

== Bibliography ==
- Dag Westerståhl (2001). "Quantifiers," in Goble, Lou, ed., The Blackwell Guide to Philosophical Logic. Blackwell.
- Stanley Peters, Dag Westerståhl (2002). "Quantifiers. "
- Heike Wiese (2003). Numbers, language, and the human mind. Cambridge University Press. ISBN 0-521-83182-2.
- Edward Keenan; Denis Paperno (2012). Handbook of Quantifiers in Natural Language. Studies in Linguistics and Philosophy. Vol. 90. Springer Science & Business Media. p. 16. ISBN 9400726813.
- Dummett, Michael (1981). Frege: Philosophy of Language (2nd ed.). Cambridge, Mass.: Harvard University Press. ISBN 0-674-31930-3.
