= Richard Montague =

American mathematician (1930–1971)

- Montague, c. 1967
- Born: Richard Merritt Montague; September 20, 1930; Stockton, California, U.S.
- Died: March 7, 1971 (aged 40); Los Angeles, California, U.S.

Education
- Education: University of California, Berkeley
- Thesis: Contributions to the Axiomatic Foundations of Set Theory (1957)
- Doctoral advisor: Alfred Tarski

Philosophical work
- Era: Contemporary philosophy
- Region: Western philosophy
- School: Analytic philosophy
- Institutions: University of California, Los Angeles
- Doctoral students: Nino Cocchiarella; Hans Kamp
- Main interests: Mathematics (axiomatic set theory, model theory), philosophical logic, philosophy of mathematics, philosophy of language
- Notable ideas: Formal semantics, Montague grammar

Richard Merritt Montague (September 20, 1930 – March 7, 1971) was an American mathematician and philosopher who made contributions to mathematical logic and the philosophy of language. He is known for proposing Montague grammar to formalize the semantics of natural language. As a student of Alfred Tarski, he also contributed early developments to axiomatic set theory (ZFC). For the latter half of his life, he was a professor at the University of California, Los Angeles until his early death, believed to be a homicide, at age 40.

== Career ==
At the University of California, Berkeley, Montague earned a BA in philosophy in 1950, an MA in mathematics in 1953, and a PhD in Philosophy in 1957, the latter under the direction of the mathematician and logician Alfred Tarski. Montague spent his entire career teaching in the UCLA Department of Philosophy, where he supervised the dissertations of Nino Cocchiarella and Hans Kamp.

Montague wrote on the foundations of logic and set theory, as would befit a student of Tarski. His PhD dissertation, titled Contributions to the Axiomatic Foundations of Set Theory, contained the first proof that all possible axiomatizations of the standard axiomatic set theory ZFC must contain infinitely many axioms. In other words, ZFC cannot be finitely axiomatized.

He pioneered a logical approach to natural language semantics that became known as Montague grammar. This approach to language has been especially influential among certain computational linguists—perhaps more so than among more traditional philosophers of language. In particular, Montague's influence lives on in grammar approaches like categorial grammar (such as Unification Categorial Grammar, Left-Associative Grammar, or Combinatory Categorial Grammar), which attempt a derivation of syntactic and semantic representation in tandem and the semantics of quantifiers, scope and discourse (Hans Kamp, a student of Montague's, co-developed Discourse Representation Theory).

Montague was an accomplished organist and a successful real estate investor. He died violently in his own home; the crime is unsolved to this day. Anita Feferman and Solomon Feferman argue that he usually went to bars "cruising" and bringing people home with him. On the day that he was murdered, he brought home several people "for some kind of soirée", but they strangled him.

== In popular culture ==
Three novels have been inspired by the life and death of Richard M. Montague:

- The Mad Man by American science fiction author Samuel R. Delany (1994)
- Less Than Meets the Eye by American philosopher David Berlinski (1994)
- The Semantics of Murder by Irish writer Aifric Campbell (2008)

== See also ==
- American philosophy
- List of American philosophers
- List of unsolved murders (1900–1979)
