= Principle of compositionality =

Principle in linguistics about meaning

In semantics, mathematical logic and related disciplines, the principle of compositionality (also known as semantic compositionalism) is the principle that the meaning of a complex expression is determined by the meanings of its constituent expressions and the rules used to combine them. The principle is also called Frege's principle, because Gottlob Frege is widely credited for the first modern formulation of it. However, the principle has never been explicitly stated by Frege, and arguably it was already assumed by George Boole decades before Frege's work.

While widely adopted in formal semantic theory, the principle of compositionality faces challenges from linguistic phenomena such as contextuality, idiomatic expressions, and quotations, which appear to defy straightforward compositional analysis.

== History ==
Discussion of compositionality started to appear at the beginning of the 19th century, during which it was debated whether what was most fundamental in language was compositionality or contextuality, and compositionality was usually preferred. Gottlob Frege never adhered to the principle of compositionality as it is known today (Frege endorsed the context principle instead), and the first to explicitly formulate it was Rudolf Carnap in 1947.

== Overview ==
A common formulation of the principle of compositionality comes from Barbara Partee, stating: "The meaning of a compound expression is a function of the meanings of its parts and of the way they are syntactically combined."

It is possible to distinguish different levels of compositionality. Strong compositionality refers to compound expressions that are determined by the meaning of its immediate parts and a top-level syntactic function that describes their combination. Weak compositionality refers to compound expressions that are determined by the meaning of its parts as well as their complete syntactic combination. However, there can also be further gradations in between these two extremes. This is possible, if one not only allows the meaning of immediate parts but also the meaning of the second-highest parts (third-highest parts, fourth-highest parts, etc.) together with functions that describes their respective combinations.

On a sentence level, the principle claims that what remains if one removes the lexical parts of a meaningful sentence, are the rules of composition. The sentence "Socrates was a man", for example, becomes "S was a M" once the meaningful lexical items—"Socrates" and "man"—are taken away. The task of finding the rules of composition, then becomes a matter of describing what the connection between S and M is.

Among the most prominent linguistic problems that challenge the principle of compositionality are the issues of contextuality, the non compositionality of idiomatic expressions, and the non compositionality of quotations.

It is frequently taken to mean that every operation of the syntax should be associated with an operation of the semantics that acts on the meanings of the constituents combined by the syntactic operation. As a guideline for constructing semantic theories, this is generally taken, as in the influential work on the philosophy of language by Donald Davidson, to mean that every construct of the syntax should be associated by a clause of the T-schema with an operator in the semantics that specifies how the meaning of the whole expression is built from constituents combined by the syntactic rule. In some general mathematical theories (especially those in the tradition of Montague grammar), this guideline is taken to mean that the interpretation of a language is essentially given by a homomorphism between an algebra of syntactic representations and an algebra of semantic objects.

The principle of compositionality also exists in a similar form in the compositionality of programming languages.

In modern linguistic work, the principle of compositionality is often resolved or explained using an axiomatized and finite formal system of semantics. However, even this attempt at formalization has its own flaws and issues.

== Critiques ==
The principle of compositionality has been the subject of intense debate. Indeed, there is no general agreement as to how the principle is to be interpreted, although there have been several attempts to provide formal definitions of it.

Scholars are also divided as to whether the principle should be regarded as a factual claim, open to empirical testing; an analytic truth, obvious from the nature of language and meaning; or a methodological principle to guide the development of theories of syntax and semantics. The Principle of Compositionality has been attacked in all three spheres, although so far none of the criticisms brought against it have been generally regarded as compelling. Most proponents of the principle, however, make certain exceptions for idiomatic expressions in natural language.

The principle of compositionality usually holds when only syntactic factors play in the increased complexity of sentence processing, while it becomes more problematic and questionable when the complexity increase is due to sentence or discourse context, semantic memory, or sensory cues. Among the problematic phenomena for traditional theories of compositionality is that of logical metonymy, which has been studied at least since the mid-1990s by linguists James Pustejovsky and Ray Jackendoff. Logical metonymies are sentences like John began the book, where the verb to begin requires (subcategorizes) an event as its argument, but in a logical metonymy an object (i.e. the book) is found instead, and this forces to interpret the sentence by inferring an implicit event ("reading", "writing", or other prototypical actions performed on a book). The problem for compositionality is that the meaning of reading or writing is not present in the words of the sentence, neither in "begin" nor in "book".

Further, in the context of the philosophy of language, the principle of compositionality does not explain all of meaning. For example, you cannot infer sarcasm purely on the basis of words and their composition, yet a phrase used sarcastically means something completely different from the same phrase uttered straightforwardly. Thus, some theorists argue that the principle has to be revised to take into account linguistic and extralinguistic context, which includes the tone of voice used, common ground between the speakers, the intentions of the speaker, and so on.

== See also ==
- Componential analysis
- Context principle
- Semantics (computer science)
- Semantics of logic
- Garden-path sentence
- Initial algebra
- Levels of Processing model
- Opaque context — another problem for compositionality
- Referential transparency — in programming languages
- Semantic decomposition (natural language processing)
