= Montague grammar =

Approach to natural language semantics

Montague grammar is an approach to natural language semantics, named after American logician Richard Montague. The Montague grammar is based on mathematical logic, especially higher-order predicate logic and lambda calculus, and makes use of the notions of intensional logic, via Kripke models. Montague pioneered this approach in the 1960s and early 1970s.

== Overview ==
Montague's thesis was that natural languages (like English) and formal languages (like programming languages) can be treated in the same way:

There is in my opinion no important theoretical difference between natural languages and the artificial languages of logicians; indeed, I consider it possible to comprehend the syntax and semantics of both kinds of language within a single natural and mathematically precise theory. On this point I differ from a number of philosophers, but agree, I believe, with Chomsky and his associates. ("Universal Grammar" 1970)

Montague published what soon became known as Montague grammar in three papers:

- 1970: "Universal grammar" (= UG)
- 1970: "English as a Formal Language" (= EFL)
- 1973: "The Proper Treatment of Quantification in Ordinary English" (= PTQ)

== Illustration ==
Montague grammar can represent the meanings of quite complex sentences compactly. Below is a grammar presented in Eijck and Unger's textbook.

The types of the syntactic categories in the grammar are as follows, with t denoting a term (a reference to an entity) and f denoting a formula.

category	symbol	type
Sentence	S	$f$
Verb phrase	VP	$t \rightarrow f$
Noun phrase	NP	$(t \rightarrow f)\rightarrow f$
Common noun	CN	$t \rightarrow f$
Determiner	DET	$(t\rightarrow f)\rightarrow((t\rightarrow f)\rightarrow f)$
Transitive verb	TV	$t \rightarrow (t \rightarrow f)$

The meaning of a sentence obtained by the rule $S : \mathit{NP}\ \mathit{VP}$ is obtained by applying the function for NP to the function for VP.

The types of VP and NP might appear unintuitive because of the question as to the meaning of a noun phrase that is not simply a term. This is because meanings of many noun phrases, such as "the man who whistles", are not just terms in predicate logic, but also include a predicate for the activity, like "whistles", which cannot be represented in the term (consisting of constant and function symbols but not of predicates). So we need some term, for example x, and a formula whistles(x) to refer to the man who whistles. The meaning of verb phrases VP can be expressed with that term, for example stating that a particular x satisfies sleeps(x) $\wedge$ snores(x) (expressed as a function from x to that formula). Now the function associated with NP takes that kind of function and combines it with the formulas needed to express the meaning of the noun phrase. This particular way of stating NP and VP is not the only possible one.

Key is the meaning of an expression is obtained as a function of its components, either by function application (indicated by boldface parentheses enclosing function and argument) or by constructing a new function from the functions associated with the component. This compositionality makes it possible to assign meanings reliably to arbitrarily complex sentence structures, with auxiliary clauses and many other complications.

The meanings of other categories of expressions are either similarly function applications, or higher-order functions. The following are the rules of the grammar, with the first column indicating a non-terminal symbol, the second column one possible way of producing that non-terminal from other non-terminals and terminals, and the third column indicating the corresponding meaning.

		meaning
S	NP VP	$\boldsymbol{(}\mathit{NP}\ \mathit{VP}\boldsymbol{)}$
NP	name	$\lambda P.\boldsymbol{(}P\ name\boldsymbol{)}$
NP	DET CN	$\boldsymbol{(}\mathit{DET}\ \mathit{CN}\boldsymbol{)}$
NP	DET RCN	$\boldsymbol{(}\mathit{DET}\ \mathit{RCN}\boldsymbol{)}$
DET	"some"	$\lambda P.\lambda Q. \exists x(\boldsymbol{(}P\ x\boldsymbol{)}\wedge\boldsymbol{(}Q\ x\boldsymbol{)})$
DET	"a"	$\lambda P.\lambda Q. \exists x(\boldsymbol{(}P\ x\boldsymbol{)}\wedge\boldsymbol{(}Q\ x\boldsymbol{)})$
DET	"every"	$\lambda P.\lambda Q.\forall x(\boldsymbol{(}P\ x\boldsymbol{)}\rightarrow\boldsymbol{(}Q\ x\boldsymbol{)})$
DET	"no"	$\lambda P.\lambda Q.\forall x(\boldsymbol{(}P\ x\boldsymbol{)}\rightarrow\neg\boldsymbol{(}Q\ x\boldsymbol{)})$
VP	intransverb	$\lambda x.intransverb(x)$
VP	TV NP	$\lambda x.\boldsymbol{(}\mathit{NP}\ \lambda y.\boldsymbol{(}\mathit{TV}\ y\ x\boldsymbol{)}\boldsymbol{)}$
TV	transverb	$\lambda y.\lambda x.transverb(x,y)$
RCN	CN "that" VP	$\lambda x.(\boldsymbol{(}\mathit{CN}\ x\boldsymbol{)}\wedge\boldsymbol{(}\mathit{VP}\ x\boldsymbol{)})$
RCN	CN "that" NP TV	$\lambda x.(\boldsymbol{(}\mathit{CN}\ x\boldsymbol{)}\wedge\boldsymbol{(}\mathit{NP}\ \lambda y.\boldsymbol{(}\mathit{TV}\ y\ x\boldsymbol{)}\boldsymbol{)})$
CN	predicate	$\lambda x.predicate(x)$

Here are example expressions and their associated meaning, according to the above grammar, showing that the meaning of a given sentence is formed from its constituent expressions, either by forming a new higher-order function, or by applying a higher-order function for one expression to the meaning of another.

expression	meaning
a	$\lambda P.\lambda Q.\exists x(\boldsymbol{(}P\ x\boldsymbol{)}\wedge\boldsymbol{}\boldsymbol{(}Q\ x\boldsymbol{)})$
man	$\lambda x.\mathit{MAN}(x)$
a man	$\lambda Q.\exists x(\mathit{MAN}(x)\wedge\boldsymbol{(}Q\ x\boldsymbol{)})$
sleeps	$\lambda x.SLEEPS(x)$
a man sleeps	$\exists x(\mathit{MAN}(x)\wedge \mathit{SLEEPS}(x))$
man that dreams	$\lambda x.(\mathit{MAN}(x)\wedge \mathit{DREAMS}(x))$
a man that dreams	$\lambda Q.\exists x(\mathit{MAN}(x)\wedge \mathit{DREAMS}(x)\wedge \boldsymbol{(}Q\ x\boldsymbol{)})$
a man that dreams sleeps	$\exists x(\mathit{MAN}(x)\wedge \mathit{DREAMS}(x)\wedge \mathit{SLEEPS}(x))$

The following are other examples of sentences translated into the predicate logic by the grammar.

sentence	translation to logic
Jill sees Jack	$sees(Jill,Jack)$
every woman sees a man	$\forall x(woman(x) \rightarrow (\exists y(man(y) \wedge sees(x,y))))$
every woman sees a man that sleeps	$\forall x(woman(x) \rightarrow (\exists y(man(y) \wedge sleeps(y) \wedge sees(x,y))))$
a woman that eats sees a man that sleeps	$\exists x(woman(x)\wedge eats(x)\wedge \exists y(man(y) \wedge sleeps(y) \wedge sees(x,y)))$

== In popular culture ==
In David Foster Wallace's novel Infinite Jest, the protagonist Hal Incandenza has written an essay entitled Montague Grammar and the Semantics of Physical Modality. Montague grammar is also referenced explicitly and implicitly several times throughout the book.

== See also ==
- Categorial grammar – Family of formalisms in natural language syntax
- Continuation-passing style – Programming style in which control is passed explicitly
- Kripke semantics – Formal semantics for non-classical logic systems
- Situation semantics – Concept in situation theory
- Temperature paradox – Logical paradox
