= Attributive expression =

Adjective, noun, verb or phrase that modifies a noun

In grammar, an attributive expression is a word or phrase within a noun phrase that modifies the head noun. It may be an:

- attributive adjective
- attributive noun
- attributive verb

or other part of speech, such as an attributive numeral.

== See also ==
- Property (attribute)
- Attribution (disambiguation)
