= Attribute =

Attribute may refer to:

- Attribute (philosophy), a characteristic of an object
- Attribute (research), a quality of an object
- Grammatical modifier, in natural languages
- Attribute (computing), a specification that defines a property of an object, element, or file
- Attribute (knowledge representation), a component of an ontology
- Attribute (role-playing games), a type of statistic for a fictional character
- Attribute (art), a symbolic object conventionally associated in visual arts with a specific individual

== See also ==
- Attribute clash, a display artefact on some home computers
- Attribute hierarchy method, a cognitively based psychometric procedure
- Attribution (disambiguation)
- Property (disambiguation)
