= AHM =

AHM may refer to:

== Arts and media ==
- Atom Heart Mother, a 1970 album by Pink Floyd
  - "Atom Heart Mother" (suite), the title song of the album
- All Hail Megatron, a series of Transformers comics by IDW Publishing; see The Transformers (IDW Publishing)

== Businesses and organizations ==
- Adventist Heritage Ministry
- Ahm, Australian private health insurance provider, subsidiary of Medibank
- Airline History Museum, aviation museum in Kansas
- American Home Mortgage
- American Honda Motor Company
- Ashland Municipal Airport, Ashland, Oregon, US
- Astra Honda Motor, Indonesian motorcycle manufacturer

== Other uses ==
- Ahm (surname), list of people with the surname
- Ashland Municipal Airport, Ashland, Oregon, US
- Asset health management
- Attribute Hierarchy Method
- Mobu language
- All-Hands Meeting (typically in a corporation)
