= Proper adjective =

Descriptive word with initial capital letter

In English orthography, the term proper adjective is used to mean adjectives that take initial capital letters, and common adjective to mean those that do not. For example, a person from India is Indian—Indian is a proper adjective.

== Etymology ==
The term proper noun denotes a noun that, grammatically speaking, identifies a specific unique entity; for example, England is a proper noun, because it is a name for a specific country, whereas dog is not a proper noun; it is, rather, a common noun because it refers to any one member of a group of dog animals.

In English orthography, most proper nouns are capitalized and most common nouns are not. As a result, the term proper noun has come to mean, in lay usage, a noun that is capitalized, and common noun to mean a noun that is not capitalized. Furthermore, English adjectives that derive from proper nouns are usually capitalized. This has led to the use of the terms proper adjective and common adjective, with meanings analogous to the lay meanings of proper noun and common noun. Proper adjectives are just capitalized adjectives.

== Description ==
Most capitalized adjectives derive from proper nouns; for example, the proper adjective American derives from the proper noun America.

Sometimes, an adjective is capitalized because it designates an ethnic group with a shared culture, heritage, or ancestry. This usage asserts the existence of a unified group with common goals. For example, in Canadian government documents, Native and Aboriginal are capitalized.

An adjective can lose its capitalization when it takes on new meanings, such as chauvinistic. In addition, over time, an adjective can lose its capitalization by convention, generally when the word has overshadowed its original reference, such as gargantuan, quixotic, titanic, or roman in the term roman numerals.

== Proper adverbs ==
An adverb formed from a capitalized adjective is itself capitalized. For example:

- We have regularly received enquiries regarding the availability of Islamic finance products, in particular Islamically compatible finance to purchase both residential and commercial properties.
- There are people who express themselves 'Germanly', while others have forms of life that are expressed 'Frenchly', 'Koreanly' or 'Icelandicly'.

== Other languages ==
In other languages which use writing systems with lowercases and uppercases, adjectives derived from proper nouns are commonly not capitalized.

=== Czech ===
Czech language uses adjectives (and adverbs) derived from proper nouns uncapitalized, e.g. český jazyk (Czech language), londýnské metro (London Underground), pražské mosty (Prague bridges), romské písně (Romani songs), hrabalovská poezie (Hrabal-style poetry) etc., if the adjective isn't the first word of a compound proper name or of the sentence.

However, possessive adjectives are capitalized as if it were some case of a noun. E.g. Petrův dům (Peter's house), Moničina tužka (Monika's pencil) etc.

A special case is the adjective Boží (God's) that is usually written with a capital letter as a possessive in a religious context, but with a small letter in the meaning "divine", also "božský".

However, less educated users of Czech are often influenced by English and transfer English capitalization rules to Czech, and it is considered an error against standard Czech.

=== French ===
French proper adjectives, like many other French adjectives, can equally well function as nouns; however, proper adjectives are not capitalized. A word denoting a nationality will be capitalized if used as a noun to mean a person (un Français "a Frenchman"), but not if used as an adjective (un médecin français "a French doctor") or as a noun to mean a language (le français "the French language"). Accordingly, in some contexts the use or absence of capitalization will alter the meaning (or connotation) of the text: compare un jeune Canadien ("a young Canadian") with un jeune canadien ("a Canadian youth"). However, words for religions are usually not capitalized: un chrétien ("a Christian").

== See also ==
- Capitalization
- Demonym
- Letter case
- List of adjectival forms of place names
- List of case-sensitive English words
- List of eponymous adjectives in English
