= Aaronic priesthood =

The Aaronic priesthood, sometimes called the Levitical priesthood, may refer to:

- Aaronic priesthood (Latter Day Saints), an order of priesthood in Latter Day Saint movement churches
- Kohen, a male descendant of biblical Aaron
