= Intersective modifier =

Utterance that conveys intersection of denotations

In linguistics, an intersective modifier is an expression which modifies another by delivering the intersection of their denotations. One example is the English adjective "blue", whose intersectivity can be seen in the fact that being a "blue pig" entails being both blue and a pig. By contrast, the English adjective "former" is non-intersective since a "former president" is neither former nor a president.

When a modifier is intersective, its contribution to the sentence's truth conditions do not depend on the particular expression it modifies. This means that one can test whether a modifier is intersective by seeing whether it gives rise to valid reasoning patterns such as the following.

1. Floyd is a Canadian surgeon.
2. Floyd is an arsonist.
3. Valid: Therefore Floyd is a Canadian arsonist.

With a non-intersective modifiers such as "skillful", the equivalent deduction would not be valid.

1. Floyd is a skillful surgeon.
2. Floyd is an arsonist.
3. Not valid: Therefore Floyd is a skillful arsonist.

Modifiers can be ambiguous, having both intersective and nonintersective interpretations. For instance, the example below has an intersective reading on which Oleg is both beautiful and a dancer, but it also has a merely subsective reading on which Oleg dances beautifully but need not himself be beautiful.

1. Oleg is a beautiful dancer.

On a textbook semantics for modification, an intersective modifier denotes the set of individuals which have the property in question. When the modifier modifies a modifiee which also denotes a set of individuals, the resulting phrase denotes the intersection of their denotations.

1. $[\![ \text{blue} ]\!] = \{x \, | \, x \text{ is blue }\}$
2. $[\![ \text{blue pig} ]\!] = \{x \, | \, x \text{ is blue }\} \cap \{x \, | \, x \text{ is a pig }\}$

Such meanings can be composed either by introducing an interpretation rule Predicate Modification which hard-codes intersectivity. However, this mode of composition can also be delivered by standard Function Application if the modifier is given a higher semantic type, either lexically or by applying a type shifter.

1. Predicate Modification Rule: If $\alpha$ is a branching node with daughters $\beta$ and $\gamma$ where $[\![\beta]\!], [\![\gamma]\!] \in \mathcal{D}_{\langle e, t \rangle}$, then $[\![\alpha]\!] = \lambda x_e \, . \, x \in [\![\beta]\!]\cap[\![\gamma]\!]$.

== See also ==
- Adjective – Part of speech that defines a noun or pronoun
- Grammatical modifier – Optional element in phrase or clause structure
- Prepositional phrase – Phrase modifying a lexical item
- Relative clause – Grammatical structure in some languages
- Subsective modifier
- Privative adjective
