= List of eponymous adjectives in English =

An eponymous adjective is an adjective which has been derived from the name of a person, real or fictional. Persons from whose name the adjectives have been derived are called eponyms.

Following is a list of eponymous adjectives in English.

== A–C ==
- Aaronic – Aaron (as in Aaronic Priesthood)
- Abbasid – Abbas ibn Abd al-Muttalib (as in Abbasid dynasty)
- abelian – Niels Henrik Abel (as in Abelian group)
- Abrahamic – Abraham (as in Abrahamic religions)
- Adamic – Adam (as in Adamic language); also Adamite (as in pre-Adamite race)
- Addisonian – Thomas Addison (as in Addisonian crisis)
- Adlerian – Alfred Adler (as in Classical Adlerian psychology)
- Aegean – Aegeus, of Greek mythology (as in Aegean Sea)
- Aeolian – Aeolus, of Greek mythology (as in Aeolian Islands); also Eolian (as in Eolian processes)
- Aeschylean – Aeschylus (as in Aeschylean silence)
- Aesopian – Aesop the Ancient Greek fabulist. (Also, conveying an innocent meaning to an outsider but a hidden meaning to a member of a conspiracy or underground movement.)
- Ahmadiyya – Ahmad (as in Ahmadiyya)
- Aldine – Aldus Manutius (as in Aldine Press)
- Alexandrine – Alexander the Great (as in Alexandrine verse); also Alexandrian (as in Alexandrian period)
- American – Amerigo Vespucci
- Amish – Jakob Ammann
- Ampèrian – André-Marie Ampère (as in Ampèrian loop)
- Anacreontic – Anacreon
- Andrean – Andrew the Apostle (as in Andrean High School)
- Antonian – St. Anthony the Great (as in Antonian monasticism); Antoninus Pius (as in Nervan-Antonian dynasty)
- Antonine – Antoninus Pius (as in Antonine Wall); Marcus Aurelius Antoninus (as in Antonine Plague)
- Apollonian – Apollo, of Greek mythology (as in Apollonian Oracle); Apollonius of Perga (as in Apollonian gasket)
- Archimedean – Archimedes (as in Archimedean screw)
- Arian – Arius
- Aristotelian – Aristotle (as in Aristotelian logic)
- Arminian – Jacobus Arminius
- Arsacid – Arsaces I of Parthia (as in Arsacid dynasty)
- Arthurian – King Arthur (as in Arthurian legend)
- Artinian – Emil Artin (as in Artinian ring)
- Ashmolean – Elias Ashmole (as in Ashmolean Museum)
- Asimovian – Isaac Asimov (as in Asimovian robot)
- Athanasian – St. Athanasius (as in Athanasian Creed)
- Athenian – Athena, of Greek mythology
- Atlantean – Atlas; also Atlantic
- Augustan – Caesar Augustus (as in Augustan drama)
- Augustinian – St. Augustine (as in Augustinian Order)
- bacchanal – Bacchus, of Roman mythology; also "bacchanalian"
- Bachian – Johann Sebastian Bach
- Baconian – Francis Bacon (as in Baconian cipher)
- Baháʼí – Bahá'u'lláh (as in Baháʼí Faith)
- Bakerian – Henry Baker (as in Bakerian Lecture)
- Bakhtinian – Mikhail Bakhtin
- Ballardian – J. G. Ballard
- Bangsian – John Kendrick Bangs (as in Bangsian fantasy)
- Barthesian – Roland Barthes
- Batesian – Henry Walter Bates (as in Batesian mimicry)
- Bayesian – Thomas Bayes (as in Bayesian probability)
- Beethovenian – Ludwig van Beethoven
- Benedictine – Benedict of Nursia (as in Benedictine Rule)
- Benthamite – Jeremy Bentham (as in Benthamite Utilitarianism)
- Berkeleyan – George Berkeley (as in Berkeleyan idealism)
- Blairite – Tony Blair
- Bodleian – Thomas Bodley (as in Bodleian Library)
- Bohmian – David Bohm (as in Bohmian mechanics)
- Bolivarian – Simón Bolívar (as in Bolivarian Revolution)
- Boolean – George Boole (as in Boolean algebra, Boolean logic)
- Borgesian – Jorge Luis Borges
- Boschian - Hieronymus Bosch
- Boulléesque – Etienne-Louis Boullée
- Bradmanesque – Donald Bradman
- Brahmsian – Johannes Brahms
- Brechtian – Bertolt Brecht (as in Brechtian acting)
- Brolic – Broly
- Brownian – Robert Brown (as in Brownian motion)
- Brunonian – John Brown, the doctor (as in Brunonian system of medicine)
- Buddhist – Gautama Buddha (as in Buddhist rosary)
- Burkean – Edmund Burke (as in Burkean conservatism)
- Byronic – Lord Byron (as in Byronic hero)
- Caesarean – often incorrectly attributed to Julius Caesar (as in Caesarean section)
- Calvinist – John Calvin (as in Calvinist Church)
- Capetian – Hugh Capet (as in Capetian dynasty, Direct Capetians)
- Capraesque – Frank Capra
- Carolean – Charles II of England (as in Carolean style)
- Carolean – Charles XI of Sweden and Charles XII of Sweden (as in Carolean soldiers)
- Caroline – Charles I of England (as in Caroline era); also Carolinian
- Carolingian – Charlemagne (as in Carolingian dynasty)
- Carrollian – Lewis Carroll, pseudonym of Charles Lutwidge Dodgson
- Carterian – James Carter (as in In Carterian Fashion)
- Cartesian – René Descartes (as in Cartesian coordinate)
- Catilinarian – Catiline (as in Catilinarian conspiracy)
- Chandleresque – Raymond Chandler
- Chaucerian – Geoffrey Chaucer (as in Chaucerian stanza)
- chauvinistic – Nicolas Chauvin
- Chekhovian – Anton Chekhov
- Chestertonian – G. K. Chesterton
- Chomskyan – Noam Chomsky; also Chomskian
- Chopinesque – Frédéric Chopin
- Chretienite - Jean Chrétien
- Christian – Jesus Christ
- Churchillian – Winston Churchill
- Churrigueresque – José Benito de Churriguera
- Ciceronian – Cicero
- Clarissine – Clare of Assisi
- Claudian – Claudius (as in Julio-Claudian dynasty)
- Clintonian – Bill Clinton
- Columbian – Christopher Columbus (as in Columbian Exchange)
- Confucianist – Confucius
- Constantinian – Constantine I (as in Constantinian dynasty)
- Coolidgean – Calvin Coolidge
- Copernican – Nicolaus Copernicus (as in Copernican heliocentrism)
- Cronenbergian – David Cronenberg
- Cromwellian – Oliver Cromwell
- Croonian – William Croone (as in Croonian Lecture)
- Cushingoid – Harvey Cushing – American physician
- Cyrillic – St. Cyril (as in Cyrillic)

== D–F ==
- daedal – Daedalus, of Greek mythology; also Daedalic and Daedalian or Daedalean
- Daliesque – Salvador Dalí
- Daltonian – John Dalton
- Dantesque – Dante Alighieri; also Dantean
- Darwinian – Charles Darwin (as in Darwinian literary studies)
- Davidic – David (as in Davidic line)
- Deleuzian – Gilles Deleuze
- Dengist – Deng Xiaoping
- Derridean – Jacques Derrida (as in Derridean deconstruction)
- desarguesian – Girard Desargues (as in desarguesian plane)
- Dickensian – Charles Dickens
- Dickinsonian – Emily Dickinson
- Diogenean – Diogenes of Sinope
- Dionysian – Dionysus, of Greek mythology (as in Dionysian Mysteries); Dionysius Exiguus (as in Dionysian era)
- Diophantine – Diophantus (as in Diophantine equation)
- Dobsonian – John Dobson (as in Dobsonian telescope)
- Dominican – Saint Dominic (as in Dominican Order)
- Dostoevskian – Fyodor Dostoevsky; also Dostoyevskian
- draconian – Draco
- Dulcinian – Fra Dolcino
- dylanesque – Bob Dylan
- Edisonian – Thomas Edison (as in Edisonian approach)
- Edwardian – King Edward VII
- Edwardine – Edward VI, (as in Edwardine Ordinals)
- Edwardsian – Jonathan Edwards
- Einsteinian – Albert Einstein
- Eliotic – T. S. Eliot
- Elizabethan – Queen Elizabeth I (as in Elizabethan era)
- Emersonian – Ralph Waldo Emerson (as in Emersonian perfectionism)
- Enochian – Enoch (as in Enochian magic)
- epicurean – Epicurus
- Erasmian – Erasmus (as in Erasmian Reformation)
- erotic – Eros, of Greek mythology
- Euclidean – Euclid (as in Euclidean geometry, Euclidean algorithm)
- Eulerian – Euler (as in Eulerian path)
- Euripidean – Euripides
- Eustachian – Eustachius (as in Eustachian tube)
- Eutychian – Eutyches of Constantinople (as in Eutychianism)
- Everettian – Hugh Everett III (as in Everettian quantum theory)
- Fabian – Quintus Fabius Maximus Verrucosus (as in Fabian strategy)
- Fallopian – Gabriele Falloppio (as in Fallopian tube)
- Falstaffian – Sir John Falstaff, Shakespeare's fictional character
- Faradic – Michael Faraday
- Fatimid – Fatima as-Zahra (as in Fatimid caliphate)
- Faulknerian – William Faulkner
- Faustian – Faust, Goethe's fictional character (as in Faustian deal)
- Felliniesque – Federico Fellini
- Flavian – Titus Flavius Vespasianus (Vespasian) (as in Flavian dynasty)
- Fordian – Henry Ford (as in Society for the Propagation of Fordian Knowledge); also Fordist
- Fortean – Charles Fort (as in Fortean Society)
- Foucauldian – Michel Foucault (as in Foucauldian discourse analysis)
- Franciscan – St. Francis of Assisi (as in Franciscan Order)
- Franklinic – Benjamin Franklin (as in Franklinic electricity, franklinic taste)
- Frederician – Frederick the Great (as in Frederician Rococo)
- Freirean – Paulo Freire (as in Freirean pedagogy)
- Freudian – Sigmund Freud (as in Freudian slip)
- Frostian – Robert Frost
- Fullerian – John 'Mad Jack' Fuller (as in Fullerian Professor of Chemistry)
- Fuxian – Johann Joseph Fux (as in Fuxian Counterpoint)

== G–J ==
- Galilean – Galileo Galilei (as in Galilean moons)
- Galvanic – Luigi Galvani (as in Galvanic cell)
- Gandhian – Mahatma Gandhi (as in Gandhian economics)
- gargantuan – Gargantua, Rabelais's fictional character
- Gaullist – Charles de Gaulle
- Gaussian – Carl Friedrich Gauss (as in Gaussian function)
- Genghisid – Genghis Khan
- Georgian – any of the first 4 Hanoverian kings of England (all named George)
- Georgist – Henry George (as in Georgism)
- Gilliamesque – Terry Gilliam (similar to Kafkaesque and Pythonesque, said of films, animations, and scenarios)
- Gladstonian – William Ewart Gladstone (as in Gladstonian Liberalism)
- Gödelian – Kurt Gödel (as in Gödelian incompleteness)
- Goulstonian – Theodore Goulston (as in Goulstonian Lecture)
- Gregorian – Pope Gregory I (as in Gregorian chant); Pope Gregory XIII (as in Gregorian calendar)
- Gricean – Paul Grice (as in Gricean maxims)
- Grundtvigian – N. F. S. Grundtvig (as in Grundtvigian Lutheranism)
- Hadrianic – Roman emperor Hadrian
- Handelian – George Frideric Handel
- Hamiltonian – Sir William Rowan Hamilton (as in Hamiltonian path); Alexander Hamilton (as in Hamiltonian economic program)
- Hamitic – Ham (as in Hamitic languages)
- Harperite - Stephen Harper
- Harveian – William Harvey (as in Harveian Oration)
- Haydnesque – Joseph Haydn
- Hayekian – Friedrich Hayek (as in Hayekian triangle)
- Hegelian – Georg Wilhelm Friedrich Hegel (as in Hegelian dialectic)
- Heideggerian - Martin Heidegger
- Henrician – King Henry VIII (as in Henrician Reformation); Henry III of France (as in Henrician Articles)
- herculean – Hercules, of Greek mythology (as in herculean task)
- hermaphroditic – Hermaphroditus, of Greek mythology
- hermetic – Hermes Trismegistus, a mythological alchemist (as in hermetic seal)
- Hermitian – Charles Hermite (as in Hermitian matrix)
- Herodian – Herod the Great (as in Herodian dynasty)
- Heronian – Hero of Alexandria (as in Heronian triangle)
- Hilbertian – David Hilbert (as in Hilbertian field)
- Hippocratic – Hippocrates (as in Hippocratic Oath)
- Hitchcockian – Alfred Hitchcock
- Hitlerian – Adolf Hitler
- Hobbesian – Thomas Hobbes
- Holmesian – Sherlock Holmes, Conan Doyle's fictional character; also Sherlockian
- Homeric – Homer
- Horatian – Horace (as in Horatian satire)
- Humean – David Hume
- Hunterian – John Hunter and William Hunter (as in Hunterian Museum)
- Hussite – Jan Hus (as in Hussite Wars)
- Hutterite – Jacob Hutter
- Ignatian – Ignatius of Loyola (as in Ignatian spirituality)
- Imeldific – Imelda Marcos (meaning ostentatious; extravagant)
- Irenic – Eirene (of Greek mythology; meaning peaceable)
- Jacksonian – Andrew Jackson (as in Jacksonian democracy); John Hughlings Jackson (as in Jacksonian seizure)
- Jacobean – King James I (as in Jacobean era)
- Jacobian – Carl Gustav Jacobi (as in Jacobian matrix)
- Jacobite – King James II (as in Jacobitism)
- Jagiellonian – Władysław II Jagiełło (as in Jagiellonian dynasty)
- Jamesian – Henry James
- Japhetic – Japheth (as in Japhetic theory)
- Jeffersonian – Thomas Jefferson (as in Jeffersonian democracy)
- Johannine – Saint John the Evangelist (as in Johannine literature)
- Johnsonian – Samuel Johnson
- Jordanesque – Michael Jordan (usually denotes remarkable athletic achievement or dominance)
- Josephite – Saint Joseph (as in Josephite Marriage or Josephite Fathers)
- jovial – Jove/Jupiter, of Roman mythology; also Jovian
- Joycean – James Joyce (as in Pre-Joycean Fellowship)
- Julian – Julius Caesar (as in Julian calendar)
- Jungian – Carl Jung (as in Jungian psychology)
- Junoesque – Juno, of Roman mythology
- Justinianic – Justinian I
- Juvenalian – Juvenal (as in Juvenalian satire)

== K–M ==
- Kafkaesque – Franz Kafka
- Kantian – Immanuel Kant
- Keatsian – John Keats
- Kemalist – Kemal Atatürk
- Kennedyesque – John F. Kennedy
- Keynesian – John Maynard Keynes (as in Keynesian economics)
- Kierkegaardian – Søren Kierkegaard
- Kimilsungist - Kim Il Sung
- Kirbyesque – Jack Kirby
- Kubrickian – Stanley Kubrick
- Lacanian – Jacques Lacan (as in Lacanian psychoanalysis)
- Lagrangian – Joseph-Louis Lagrange (as in Lagrangian point)
- Lamarckian – Jean-Baptiste Lamarck (as in Lamarckian evolution)
- Landian – Nick Land
- Laplacian – Pierre-Simon Laplace (as in Laplacian field, Laplacian matrix)
- Levitical – Levi (as in Levitical priesthood)
- Leibnizian – Gottfried Leibniz (as in Leibnizian calculus)
- Leninist – Vladimir Lenin
- Lilian – Aloysius Lilius (as in Lilian date)
- Linnaean – Carl Linnaeus (as in Linnaean taxonomy)
- Lincolnesque – Abraham Lincoln; also Lincolnian
- Lisztian – Franz Liszt
- Lockean – John Locke
- Lorentzian – Hendrik Lorentz (as in Lorentzian function)
- Lovecraftian – H. P. Lovecraft (as in Lovecraftian horror)
- Lucan – Saint Luke the Evangelist (as in Lucan Theology)
- Lucasian – Henry Lucas (as in Lucasian Professor)
- Luddite – Ned Ludd
- Lullian – Ramon Llull (as in Lullian art); also Llullian
- Lumleian – John Lumley, 1st Baron Lumley (as in Lumleian Lectures)
- Lutheran – Martin Luther
- Lynchian – David Lynch
- macadamized – John Loudon McAdam (as in macadamized system)
- Maccabean – Judas Maccabeus (as in Maccabean revolt)
- MacGyverian – Angus MacGyver
- Machiavellian – Niccolò Machiavelli
- MacIntyrean – Alasdair MacIntyre (as in MacIntyrean moral tradition)
- Madisonian – James Madison (as in Madisonian Model)
- Maistrean – Joseph de Maistre
- Magellanic – Ferdinand Magellan (as in Magellanic Clouds)
- Mahlerian – Gustav Mahler
- Malpighian – Marcello Malpighi (as in Malpighian corpuscle)
- Malthusian – Thomas Malthus (as in Malthusian catastrophe)
- Manichaean – Mani
- manueline – Manuel I of Portugal
- Maoist – Mao Zedong
- Marcan – Saint Mark the Evangelist, (as in Marcan Priority)
- Marcusean - Herbert Marcuse, relating to Herbert Marcuse (1898–1979), German-American Marxist philosopher.
- Marian – Mary (as in Marian apparition); Gaius Marius (as in Marian reforms)
- Marivaudian – Pierre de Marivaux
- Markovian – Andrey Markov (as in Markovian process)
- Marlenesque – Marlene Dietrich (as in Marlenesque nose)
- Marlovian – Christopher Marlowe (as in Marlovian theory)
- martial – Mars, of Roman mythology (as in Martial arts)
- Martinite - Paul Martin
- Marxist – Karl Marx (as in Marxist theory); also Marxian (as in Marxian economics)
- Maslowian – Abraham Maslow; also Maslovian
- masochistic – Leopold von Sacher-Masoch
- Matthean – Saint Matthew the Evangelist, (as in Matthean Exception)
- maudlin – Mary Magdalene
- Maxwellian – James Clerk Maxwell (as in Maxwellian distribution, Maxwellian demon)
- mazarine – Cardinal Mazarin (as in mazarine blue)
- McCarthyist – Joseph McCarthy
- Melchizedek – Melchizedek (as in Melchizedek priesthood)
- Mendelian – Gregor Mendel (as in Mendelian inheritance)
- Mendelssohnian – Felix Mendelssohn
- Menippean – Menippus (as in Menippean satire)
- Mennonite – Menno Simons
- mercurial – Mercury
- Merovingian – Merovech (as in Merovingian dynasty)
- Metonic – Meton (as in Metonic cycle)
- Millian – John Stuart Mill (as in Millian theory of proper names)
- Miltonic – John Milton; also Miltonian
- Minkowskian – Hermann Minkowski
- Mithridatic – Mithridates VI (as in Mithridatic Wars)
- Mohammedan – Muhammad (as in Mohammedan art)
- Mosaic – Moses (as in Mosaic Law, but not as in mosaic floor)
- Mozartean – Wolfgang Mozart

== N–Q ==
- Napierian – John Napier (as in Napierian logarithm)
- Napoleonic – Napoléon Bonaparte (as in Napoleonic Code)
- narcissistic – Narcissus, of Greek mythology (as in Narcissistic personality disorder)
- Nasserist – Gamal Abdel Nasser
- Nehruvian – Jawaharlal Nehru
- Neronian – Nero
- Nervan – Nerva (as in Nervan-Antonian dynasty)
- Nestorian – Nestorius (as in Nestorian Schism)
- Newtonian – Isaac Newton (as in Newtonian telescope)
- Nietzschean – Friedrich Nietzsche (as in Nietzschean affirmation)
- Nixonian – Richard Nixon
- Noachian – Noah (as in Noachian deluge)
- Noetherian – Emmy Noether (as in Noetherian ring)
- Norquistian – Grover Norquist
- Odinic – Odin
- Odyssean – Odysseus
- Oedipal – Oedipus, of Greek mythology (as in Oedipal complex)
- ohmic – Georg Ohm (as in ohmic device)
- onanistic – Onan
- Orbanist – Victor Orban
- Orphic – Orpheus, of Greek mythology (as in Orphic Mysteries)
- Orwellian – George Orwell
- Osirian – Osiris, of Egyptian mythology
- Ottoman – Osman I (as in Ottoman Empire)
- Ottonian – Otto I the Great (as in Ottonian dynasty)
- Ovidian – Ovid
- Oxfordian – Edward de Vere, 17th Earl of Oxford (as in Oxfordian theory)
- Palinian – Michael Palin (as in Palinian wit)
- Palladian – Andrea Palladio (as in Palladian architecture)
- Panglossian – Pangloss, Voltaire's fictional character
- pappian – Pappus of Alexandria (as in pappian plane)
- Paracelsian – Paracelsus
- parkinsonian – James Parkinson (as in parkinsonian syndrome)
- pasteurized – Louis Pasteur (as in pasteurized milk)
- Pauline – Paul of Tarsus (as in Pauline epistles)
- Pavlovian – Ivan Pavlov (as in Pavlovian conditioning)
- Pecksniffian – Seth Pecksniff, Dickens' fictional character
- Pelagian – Pelagius (as in Pelagian heresy)
- Pepysian – Samuel Pepys
- Periclean – Pericles (as in Periclean Athens)
- Petersonian – Jordan Peterson
- Petrine – Saint Peter (as in Petrine primacy); also Peter the Great (as in Petrine baroque)
- Phildickian – Philip K. Dick
- Piagetian – Jean Piaget (as in Piagetian theory)
- Pickwickian – Samuel Pickwick, Dickens' fictional character
- Pigouvian – Arthur Cecil Pigou (as in Pigouvian Tax)
- Pinteresque – Harold Pinter
- Platonic – Plato (as in Platonic love)
- Plinian – Pliny (as in Plinian eruption)
- Plutarchian – Plutarch
- plutonic – Pluto, of Greek & Roman mythology (as in Plutonic theory); also plutonian
- Pollyannish – Pollyanna, fictional character
- Pombaline – Marquis of Pombal (as in Pombaline Downtown)
- Popperian – Karl Popper (as in Popperian falsification)
- Procrustean – Procrustes, of Greek mythology (as in Pombaline Downtown)
- Promethean – Prometheus, of Greek mythology
- protean – Proteus, of Greek mythology
- Proustian – Marcel Proust (as in Proustian memory)
- Ptolemaic – Ptolemy (as in Ptolemaic system); Ptolemy I Soter (as in Ptolemaic dynasty)
- Putinist – Vladimir Putin (as in Putinist Russia)
- Pyrrhic – Pyrrhus of Epirus (as in Pyrrhic victory)
- Pyrrhonian – Pyrrho (as in Pyrrhonian skepticism)
- Pythagorean – Pythagoras (as in Pythagorean theorem)
- Pythonic – Monty Python, a more correct eponym, used by Terry Jones, for the more commonly used Pythonesque (as in Pythonic sketches)
- Pythonesque – Monty Python, fictional character name from television comedy (as in Pythonesque humour)
- Quirinal – Quirinus, of Roman mythology (as in Quirinal Hill)
- quixotic – Don Quixote, Cervantes' fictional character

== R–U ==
- Rabelaisian – François Rabelais
- Rachmaninovian – Sergei Rachmaninoff
- Ramesside – Ramesses I (as in Ramesside period)
- Randian – Ayn Rand (as in Randian hero)
- Raphaelesque – Raphael; also Raphaelite (as in Pre-Raphaelite Brotherhood)
- Rastafarian – Ras Tafari (Haile Selassie)
- Reaganesque – Ronald Reagan
- Reithian – John Reith (as in Reithian principles)
- Ricardian – David Ricardo (as in Ricardian economics)
- Richardsonian – Henry Hobson Richardson (as in Richardsonian Romanesque)
- Riemannian – Bernhard Riemann (as in Riemannian geometry)
- ritzy – César Ritz
- Rockwellian – Norman Rockwell
- Rogerian – Carl Rogers (as in Rogerian therapy)
- Rothbardian – Murray N. Rothbard
- Rousseauian – Jean-Jacques Rousseau
- Rubenesque – Peter Paul Rubens
- Rumsfeldian – Donald Rumsfeld
- Ruthian – Babe Ruth
- sadistic – Marquis de Sade
- Sambergian – Andy Samberg
- Samsonian – Samson
- Sapphic – Sappho (as in Sapphic love)
- Sartrean – Jean-Paul Sartre
- Sasanian – Sassan (as in Sasanian dynasty); also Sassanian, Sassanid
- satanic – Satan (as in Satanic Verses)
- Saturnine – Saturn (as in Saturnine temperament)
- Schenkerian – Heinrich Schenker as in Schenkerian analysis
- Schubertian – Franz Schubert
- Seleucid – Seleucus I Nicator (as in Seleucid Empire)
- Seljuk – Seljuk (as in Seljuk Empire)
- Semitic – Shem (as in Semitic languages)
- Senecan – Seneca (as in Senecan Tragedy)
- Servian – Servius Tullius (as in Servian Wall)
- Severan – Septimius Severus (as in Severan dynasty)
- Shakespearean – William Shakespeare (as in Shakespearean authorship, Shakespearean tragedy)
- Shavian – George Bernard Shaw (as in Shavian alphabet, Shavian reversal)
- Sistine – Pope Sixtus IV (as in Sistine Chapel)
- Sisyphean – Sisyphus, of Greek mythology
- Skinnerian – B. F. Skinner (as in Skinnerian behaviorism)
- Smithsonian – James Smithson (as in Smithsonian Institution)
- Socinian – Faustus Socinus
- Socratic – Socrates (as in Socratic method)
- Solomonic – Solomon (as in Solomonic dynasty)
- Solonian – Solon (as in Solonian Constitution)
- Sophoclean – Sophocles
- Spencerian – Platt Rogers Spencer (as in Spencerian script)
- Spenserian – Edmund Spenser (as in Spenserian stanza)
- Spielbergian – Steven Spielberg
- Spinozist – Baruch Spinoza (as in Spinozism)
- Stalinist – Joseph Stalin (as in Stalinist architecture)
- stentorian – Stentor, of Greek mythology
- Swiftian – Jonathan Swift (as in Swiftian satire) or Taylor Swift (as in Swiftian songwriting)
- sybaritic – Sybaris
- tantalizing – Tantalus
- Tennysonian – Alfred, Lord Tennyson
- terpsichorean – Terpsichore
- Thalesian – Thales
- Thatcherite – Margaret Thatcher
- Theodosian – Count Theodosius (as in Theodosian dynasty)
- thespian – Thespis
- Thomist – St. Thomas Aquinas (as in Thomist philosophy)
- Thomsonian – Dr. Samuel Thomson (as in Thomsonian Medicine)
- Thoreauvian – Henry David Thoreau
- thrasonical – Thraso, Terence's fictional character
- Titchy – Little Tich, stage name of Harry Relph
- Titian – Titian (as in titian-coloured)
- Timurid – Timur (Tamerlane) (as in Timurid Empire)
- Tironian – Marcus Tullius Tiro (as in Tironian notes)
- Titanic – Titan (as in Titanic prime)
- Tolkienism – J. R. R. Tolkien
- Tolstoyan – Leo Tolstoy; also Tolstoian
- Torricellian – Evangelista Torricelli (as in Torricellian chamber)
- Trotskyist – Leon Trotsky; also Trotskyite
- Trudeauvian - Pierre or Justin Trudeau
- Trumpian – Donald Trump
- Tychonic – Tycho Brahe (as in Tychonic system); also Tychonian
- Umayyad – Umayya ibn Abd Shams (as in Umayyad dynasty)

== V–Z ==
- Vattelian – Emer de Vattel
- Vesalian – Vesalius
- Vestal – Vesta, of Roman mythology (as in Vestal Virgin)
- Victorian – Queen Victoria (as in Victorian era)
- Virgilian – Virgil; also Vergilian
- Vitruvian – Marcus Vitruvius Pollio (as in Vitruvian Man)
- Voltaic – Alessandro Volta (as in Voltaic pile)
- Voltairean – Voltaire
- Vonnegutian – Kurt Vonnegut, Jr.
- Vygotskian – Lev Vygotsky
- Wagnerian – Richard Wagner (as in Wagnerian rock)
- Waldensian – Peter Waldo (as in Waldensian Church)
- Wardian – Nathaniel Bagshaw Ward (as in Wardian Case)
- Washingtonian – George Washington; Martha Washington (as in Washingtonian movement)
- Wesleyan – John Wesley (as in Wesleyan Church)
- Wavian – Evelyn Waugh
- Whedonesque – Joss Whedon (popularized by the fan site Whedonesque.com)
- Whitlamesque – Gough Whitlam
- Wildean – Oscar Wilde
- Williamite – King William III (as in Williamite War)
- Wilsonian – Woodrow Wilson
- Wolffian – Caspar Friedrich Wolff (a Wolffian body, as in Wolffian duct) and Christian Wolff (philosopher)
- Woodwardian – John Woodward (as in Woodwardian Professor of Geology)
- Wordsworthean – William Wordsworth, (as in Wadsworthean ego)
- Wronskian – Josef Hoëné-Wroński (as in Wronskian determinant)
- Ximenean – Derrick Somerset Macnutt (pen name: Ximenes) (as in Ximenean principles)
- Zoroastrian – Zoroaster (Zarathustra); also Zarathustrian
- Zwinglian – Huldrych Zwingli

== See also ==
- List of eponyms
- All pages begging with "List of things named after"
