= Adnoun =

Dual-meaning linguistic term

Adnoun is a linguistic term used with two different meanings.

== Hyponym of adjective ==
An adnoun is a kind of lexical category. In English, it is a word that is usually an adjective, but is being used as a noun. The origin of the word is thought to date to around 1763-1792. Often these usages are simply identified as the noun form of the word.

Examples:

- "guide-dogs for the blind", "blind" is an adnoun because it stands in for the noun phrase "blind people"
- "tax cuts for the rich", "rich" is an adnoun because it stands in for the noun phrase "rich people"

== Synonym of adjective ==
Adnoun is an alternative term, which is considered to be archaic for adjective. As John Eliot states in his 1666 Indian Grammar Begun..., "An Adnoun is a part of Speech that attendeth upon a Noun, and signifieth the Qualification thereof."
