= Privative adjective =

Adjective which excludes members of its noun's extension

In linguistics, a privative adjective is an adjective which seems to exclude members of the extension of the noun which it modifies. For instance, "fake" is privative since a "fake nose" is not an actual nose. Other examples in English include "pretend", "fictitious", and "artificial". The defining feature of privative adjectives is shown below in set theoretic notation.

1. An adjective $\text{Adj}$ is privative if for any noun $\text{N}$, we have that $[\![ \text{Adj N} ]\!] \cap [\![\text{N}]\!] = \emptyset$.

Privative adjectives are non-subsective, but behave differently from ordinary non-subsectives in important respects, at least in English. While ordinary non-subsectives such as the modal adjective "alleged" can only be used in attributive position, privative adjectives can be used either in attributive or predicative position. In this regard, privative adjectives pattern more like intersective adjectives such as "blue".

1. Sara is an alleged spy. (non-subsective, attributive)
2. #Sara is alleged. (non-subsective, predicative)
1. That is a fake nose. (privative, attributive)
2. That nose is fake. (privative, predicative)
1. That is a blue pig. (intersective, attributive)
2. That pig is blue. (intersective, predicative)

In part because of this pattern, Partee (1997) argued that privative adjectives are in fact intersective adjectives which coerce a broader interpretation of the nouns they modify. On this analysis, listeners treat fake noses as falling within the extension of the noun "nose" because refusing to do so would render the expression "fake nose" self-contradictory.

== See also ==
- Adjective
- Grammatical modifier
- Intersective modifier
- Subsective modifier
