= Subsective modifier =

Type of linguistic element

In linguistics, a subsective modifier is an expression which modifies another by delivering a subset of its denotation. For instance, the English adjective "skilled" is subsective since being a skilled surgeon entails being a surgeon. By contrast, the English adjective "alleged" is non-subsective since an "alleged spy" need not be an actual spy.

1. $[\![ \text{skilled surgeon} ]\!] \subseteq [\![\text{surgeon}]\!]$

A modifier can be subsective without being intersective. For instance, calling someone an "old friend" entails that they are a friend but does not entail that they are elderly. The term "subsective" is most often applied to modifiers which are not intersective and non-intersectivity is sometimes treated as part of its definition.

There is no standard analysis for the semantics of (non-intersective) subsective modifiers. Early work such as Montague (1970) took subsective adjectives as evidence that adjectives do not denote properties which compose intersectively but rather functions which take and return a property which may or may not make an intersective semantic contribution. However, subsequent work has shown that variants of the property-based analysis can in fact account for the data. For instance, vague predicates often pass standard tests for nonintersectivity, e.g. "Neutrons are big subatomic particles" doesn't entail that neutrons are actually big but have in fact be analyzed as intersective using degree semantics. Current work tends to assume that the phenomenon of subsectivity is not a natural class.

== Adverbial readings ==
Subsectivity can arise when an adjective receives an adverbial reading. For instance, the subsective modifiers in the examples below do not express intrinsic qualities of the subject but rather the manner in which the subject typically performs a particular action. (Without the parenthetical, these examples would be ambiguous between an adverbial reading and a garden variety intersective reading.)

1. Oleg is a beautiful dancer (even though he himself is ugly).
2. Vanessa is a meticulous experimentalist (even though she's a slob).
3. Shaggy is a fierce advocate of gluttony (even though he's a coward).

Examples of this sort have been analyzed within a Davidsonian semantics as modifying an event variable introduced by the noun. In this analysis, an agentive noun such as "dancer" is formed by applying a generic quantifier gen to a predicate) which is true of dancing events. The quantifier gen provides a habitual-like meaning, taking a predicate of events and returning a predicate) which is true of an individual if they are the agent of the typical such event.

1. $[\![ \text{dance} ]\!] = \{e \, | \, e \text{ is a dancing event }\}$
2. $[\![$gen$\!\text{ dance} ]\!] = \{ x \, | \, x \text{ is the agent of all contextually relevant dancing events } \}$

In this analysis, adjectives such as "beautiful", "meticulous", and "fierce" can denote properties either of events or of individuals.

1. $[\![ \text{beautiful}_1 ]\!] = \{e \, | \, e \text{ is beautiful }\}$
2. $[\![ \text{beautiful}_2 ]\!] = \{x \, | \, x \text{ is beautiful }\}$

When the adjective takes scope above gen it must be interpreted as a predicate of individuals; when it scopes below gen it must be interpreted as a predicate of events. In this latter case, the denotation of the adjective can still compose intersectively.

1. $[\![ \text{beautiful}_1 \text{dance} ]\!] = \{e \, | \, e \text{ is beautiful } \} \cap \{ e \, | \, e \text{ is a dancing event }\}$

Thus, on this analysis, to say that Oleg is a beautiful dancer is to say that he is the typical agent of typical beautiful dancing events. This is technically an intersective reading since it is derived by intersecting the modifier with the noun. However, it does not look like a typical intersective meaning since it does not require that Oleg himself be an element of that intersection—rather that he be the agent of certain events in that intersection.

== See also ==
- Adjective
- Grammatical modifier
- Intersective modifier
- Privative adjective
