= Ahm (surname) =

Ahm is a surname, and notable people with the surname include:

- Maria Ahm (born 1998), Danish athlete
- Povl Ahm (1926–2005), Danish engineer
- Tonny Ahm (1914–1993), Danish badminton player
