= Ahm House =

Coordinates: 51.7983°N 0.3605°W

The Ahm House at 44 West Common Way is a house in Harpenden in Hertfordshire, England. It was built between 1961 and 1963 by the structural engineer Povl Ahm, a partner of Ove Arup, for himself to a design by the Danish architect Jørn Utzon. Ahm, Arup and Utzon were working on the design and construction of Sydney Opera House at the time of the house's construction.

The house has been listed Grade II on the National Heritage List for England since July 1998. In their official listed building report Historic England described the house as "a distinguished and beautifully detailed modern house, in the idiom of an important architect who built relatively little". Nikolaus Pevsner in the Hertfordshire edition of his Buildings of England series described the Ahm House as an "interesting modern house ... [that] makes no concessions to the outsider nor to the genteel facadism of its neighbours. All that one sees from the road is a yawning carport with a rhythm of projecting concrete beam-ends above, and a tall blank yellow brick wall on the right".
