= Noun adjunct =

Grammatical construct in which a noun modifies another noun

In grammar, a noun adjunct, attributive noun, qualifying noun, noun (pre)modifier, or apposite noun is an optional noun that modifies another noun; functioning similarly to an adjective, it is, more specifically, a noun functioning as a pre-modifier in a noun phrase. For example, in the phrase "chicken soup" the noun adjunct "chicken" modifies the noun "soup". It is irrelevant whether the resulting compound noun is spelled in one or two parts. "Field" is a noun adjunct in both "field player" and "fieldhouse".

== Related concepts ==
The adjectival noun term was formerly synonymous with noun adjunct but now usually means nominalized adjective (i.e., an adjective used as a noun) as a term that contrasts the noun adjunct process, e.g. the Irish meaning "Irish people" or the poor meaning "poor people." Japanese adjectival nouns are a different concept.

== English ==
=== Singular vs plural ===
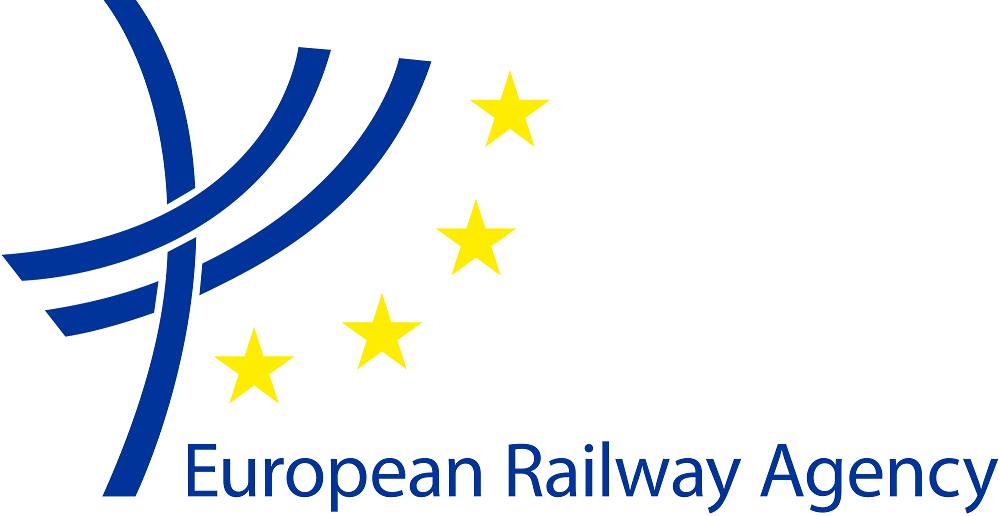
Old logo of the European Railway Agency, in which the noun modifier "railway" is singular

Noun adjuncts were traditionally mostly singular (e.g., "trouser press") except when there were lexical restrictions (e.g., "arms race"), but there is a recent trend towards more use of plural ones (e.g., "sales department", "jobs program", "systems analyst"). Many of these can also be or were originally interpreted and spelled as plural possessives (e.g. "chemicals' agency", "writers' conference", "Rangers' hockey game"), but they are now often written without the apostrophe, although decisions when to do so require editorial judgment. There are morphological restrictions on the classes of adjunct that can be plural and nonpossessive; irregular plurals are solecistic as nonpossessive adjuncts (for example, "men clothing" or "women magazine" sounds improper to fluent speakers).

Fowler's Modern English Usage states in the section "Possessive Puzzles":

Five years' imprisonment, Three weeks' holiday, etc. Years and weeks may be treated as possessives and given an apostrophe or as adjectival nouns without one. The former is perhaps better, as to conform to what is inevitable in the singular – a year's imprisonment, a fortnight's holiday.

=== Recursive use ===
Noun adjuncts can also be strung together in a longer sequence preceding the final noun, with each added noun modifying the noun which follows it, in effect creating a multiple-word noun adjunct which modifies the following noun (e.g., "chicken soup bowl", in which "chicken" modifies "soup" and "chicken soup" modifies "bowl"). There is no theoretical limit to the number of noun adjuncts which can be added before a noun, and very long constructions are occasionally seen, for example "Dawlish pub car park cliff plunge man rescued", in which "pub", "car park", "cliff", and "plunge" are all noun adjuncts. They could each be removed successively (starting at the beginning of the sentence) without changing the grammar of the sentence. This type of construction is not uncommon in headlinese, the condensed grammar used in newspaper headlines.

=== Use when an adjectivally inflected alternative is available ===
It is a trait of natural language that there is often more than one way to say something. Any logically valid option will usually find some currency in natural usage. Thus "erythrocyte maturation" and "erythrocytic maturation" can both be heard, the first using a noun adjunct and the second using an adjectival inflection. In some cases one of the equivalent forms has greater idiomaticity; thus "cell cycle" is more commonly used than "cellular cycle." In some cases, each form tends to adhere to a certain sense; thus "face mask" is the normal term in hockey, and "facial mask" is heard more often in spa treatments. Although "spine cord" is not an idiomatic alternative to "spinal cord", in other cases, the options are arbitrarily interchangeable with negligible idiomatic difference; thus "spine injury" and "spinal injury" coexist and are equivalent from any practical viewpoint, as are "meniscus transplant" and "meniscal transplant". A special case in medical usage is "visual examination" versus "vision examination": the first typically means "an examination made visually", whereas the latter means "an examination of the patient's vision".

=== Using prepositions after such phrases ===
In contexts where they are used frequently, noun phrases can become lexical bundles that effectively serve as single semantic units. One consequence of this bundling can be an otherwise unconventional location for prepositions. For example, in contexts where the phrase "regulatory impact analysis" is readily understood, a sequence like "regulatory impact analysis of the law on business" would not pose difficulty. Readers unfamiliar with the core phrase "regulatory impact analysis" may find "analysis of the regulatory impact of the law on business" or "regulatory impact analysis of the law's effects on business" easier to parse.

=== Postpositive noun adjuncts ===
The English language is restrictive in its use of postpositive position for adjectival units (words or phrases), making English use of postpositive adjectives—although not rare—much less common than use of attributive/prepositive position. This restrictive tendency is even stronger regarding noun adjuncts; examples of postpositive noun adjuncts are rare in English, except in certain established uses such as names of lakes or operations, for example Lake Ontario and Operation Desert Storm. Relatedly, in English when an institution is named in honor of a person, the person's name is idiomatically in prepositive position (for example, the NICHD is the Eunice Kennedy Shriver National Institute of Child Health and Human Development), whereas various other languages tend to put it in postpositive position (sometimes in quotation marks); their pattern would translate overliterally as National Institute of Child Health and Human Development "Eunice Kennedy Shriver".

== See also ==
- Attributive verb
- Gerund
- Participle
- Nominalized adjective, an adjective used as a noun
- Apostrophe Protection Society
