= Povl Ahm =

Danish structural engineer

- Born: 26 September 1926; Aarhus, Denmark
- Died: 15 May 2005 (aged 78)
- Education: Polyteknisk Læreanstalt
- Spouse: Birgit Moller
- Children: Carsten Ahm; Peter Ahm
- Engineering career
- Discipline: Structural engineer Civil engineer
- Institutions: Institution of Civil Engineers
- Practice name: Ove Arup & Partners
- Projects: Sydney Opera House; Centre Pompidou; Coventry Cathedral; Gateshead Viaduct
- Awards: ICE Gold Medal; CBE

Povl Ahm (26 September 1926 – 15 May 2005) was a structural engineer and former chairman of Ove Arup & Partners.

== Life ==
Born in Aarhus, Denmark, Ahm attended the Polyteknisk Læreanstalt in Copenhagen, from where he graduated in 1949.

Ahm married Birgit Moller in 1953, with whom he had two sons, Carsten Ahm and Peter Ahm.

He was a keen sportsman, and a good footballer. He played for the London amateur team Corinthian-Casuals and played in the 1956 Amateur Cup Final at Wembley Stadium.

He died of cancer on 15 May 2005.

== Career ==
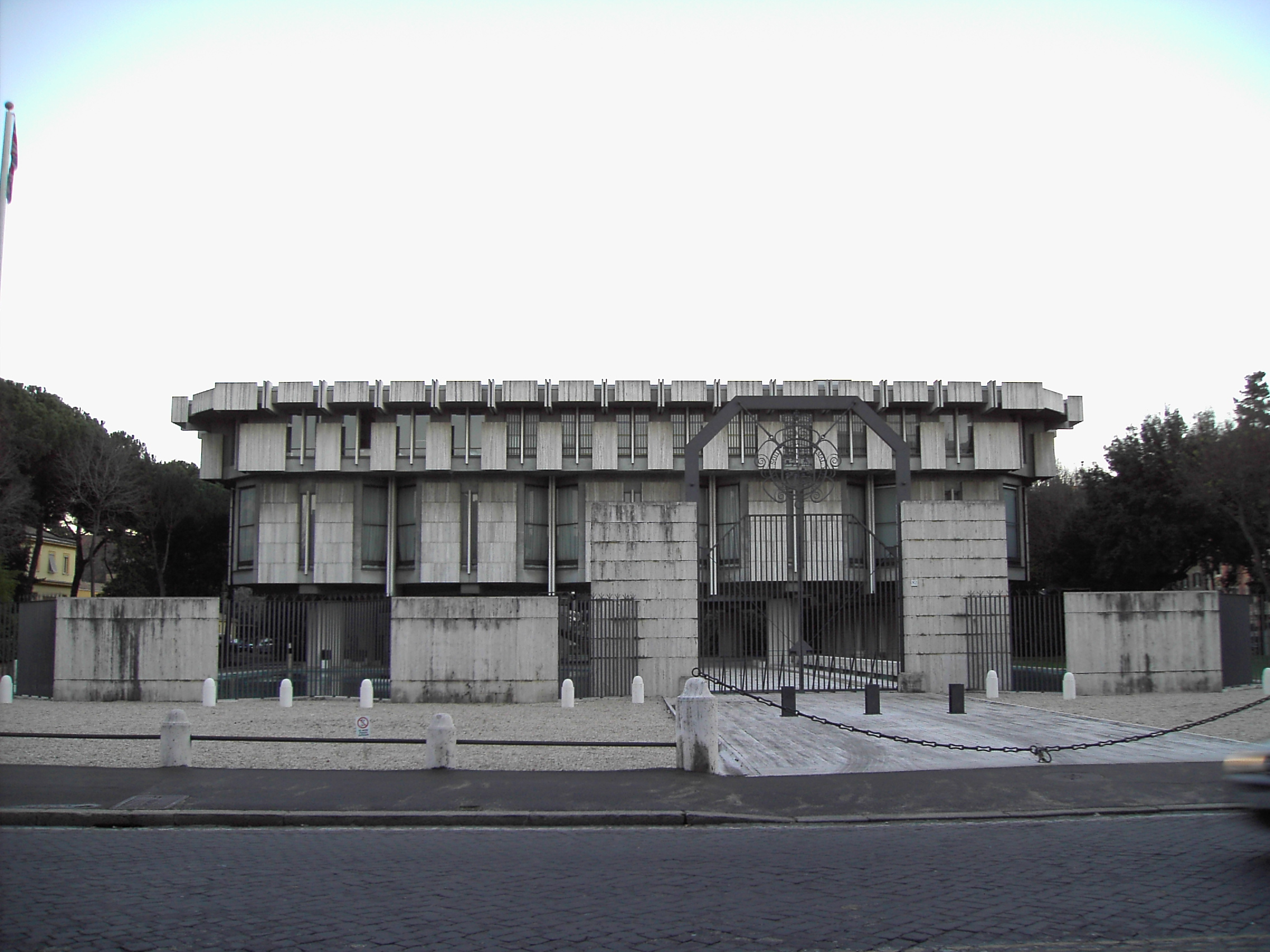
British Embassy in Rome

He joined the firm Ove Arup and Partners in London in 1952, where he worked on Coventry Cathedral with Basil Spence. In his own words:

"It was an architectural concept showing clearly the ecclesiastical functions but without any clear definition of structural concept, for so far no engineer had been involved in the design."

Ahm was given great responsibility on this project, working directly with Ove Arup.

He also worked on early conceptual design schemes for the Sydney Opera House, and worked on other projects, including Smithfield Market, London and Centre Pompidou, Paris – some of Ove Arup & Partners' most prestigious projects.

The architect of Sydney Opera House, Jørn Utzon, later went on to design a house for Ahm in Hertfordshire - a project which avoided the many problems of Sydney Opera House.

In 1957 Ahm was made an associate partner of Ove Arup & Partners, and in 1965 he was made a full partner, becoming a director of the firm after its ownership was rearranged in 1977 (the firm was now owned in trust for the staff).

By winning the competition to design the Gateshead Viaduct in 1965, Ahm started the firm's new transport group, specialising in bridges.

From 1989 to 1992 he was chairman of the firm. He was made a Fellow of the Royal Academy of Engineering in 1981.

Ahm was an active member of the Institution of Civil Engineers, acting as a Council Member twice, and becoming Vice Chairman of Registered Engineers for Disaster Relief from 1989 to 1993. From 1992 to 1996 he was chairman of the Association of Consulting Engineers.

== Notable projects ==
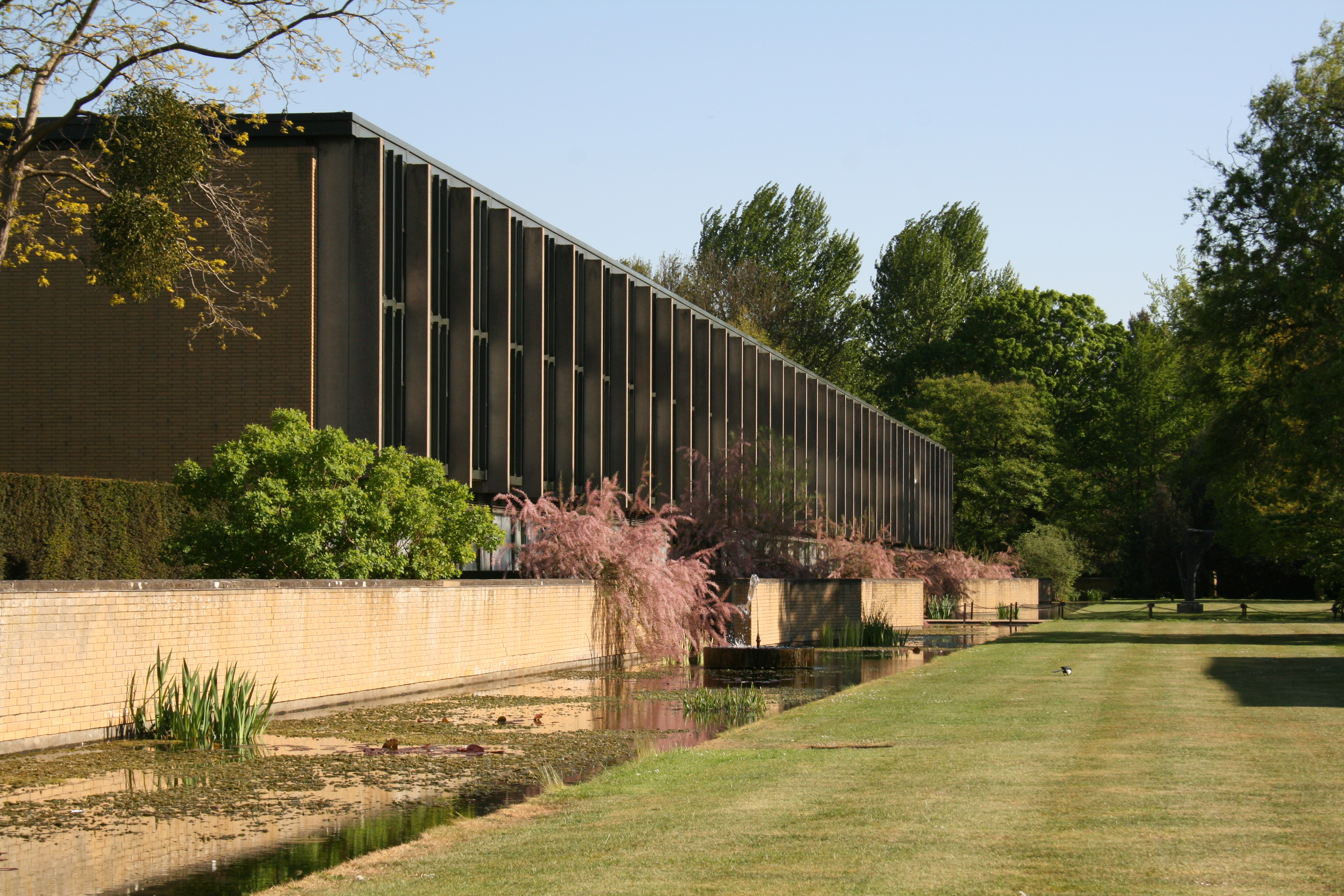
St Catherine's College, Oxford

- Coventry Cathedral,
- St Catherine's College, Oxford, 1960
- University of Sussex, 1962
- 44 West Common Way (Ahm House), Harpenden, Hertfordshire, 1963
- Gateshead Viaduct, 1965
- Centre Pompidou, 1974
- British Embassy in Rome, 1975
- Danish Embassy in London, 1978

== Awards ==
Ahm was awarded the ICE's first gold medal in 1993; the same year he received a CBE for services to engineering.

He received an honorary doctorate from University of Warwick in 1994.
