= Property (disambiguation) =

Property is the ownership of land, resources, improvements or other tangible objects, or intellectual property.

Property may also refer to:

== Philosophy and science ==
- Property (philosophy), in philosophy and logic, an abstraction characterizing an object
- Material properties, properties by which the benefits of one material versus another can be assessed
- Chemical property, a material's properties that becomes evident during a chemical reaction
- Physical property, any property that is measurable whose value describes a state of a physical system
- Thermodynamic properties, in thermodynamics and materials science, intensive and extensive physical properties of substances
- Mathematical property, a property is any characteristic that applies to a given set
- Semantic property
- Mental property, a property of the mind studied by many sciences and parasciences

== Computer science ==
- Property (programming), a type of class member in object-oriented programming
- .properties, a Java Properties File to store program settings as name-value pairs
- Window property, data associated to a window in the X Window System
- Property of a Resource Description Framework class, possessing a value domain and range
- Linear time property, a property that a computer system must satisfy

== Law and politics ==
- Real property, a piece of land defined by boundaries to which ownership is usually ascribed, including any improvements on this land
- Property rights (economics), a discussion of the role of property in economic theory
- National Register of Historic Places property types, a site designated and classified by its type on the U.S. National Register of Historic Places
- Personal property, property that is moveable

== Other uses ==
- Property (novel), a novel by Valerie Martin
- Theatrical property (commonly "prop") a portable object seen on stage or film set
