= Attribution =

Attribution may refer to:

- Attribution (copyright), concept in copyright law requiring an author to be credited
- Attribution (information security), identification of the origin of an attack
- Attribution (journalism), the identification of the source of reported information
- Attribution (law), legal doctrines by which liability is extended to a defendant who did not actually commit the criminal act
- Attribution (marketing), concept in marketing of assigning a value to a marketing activity based on desired outcome
- Attribution (psychology), concept in psychology whereby people attribute traits and causes to things they observe
- Extreme event attribution, estimation of how climate change affects recent extreme weather events
- Performance attribution, technique in quantitative finance for explaining the active performance of a portfolio

== See also ==
- Attribute (disambiguation)
- Credits
