= Ashland Municipal Airport =

Airport in Oregon, United States

Ashland Municipal Airport Sumner Parker Field
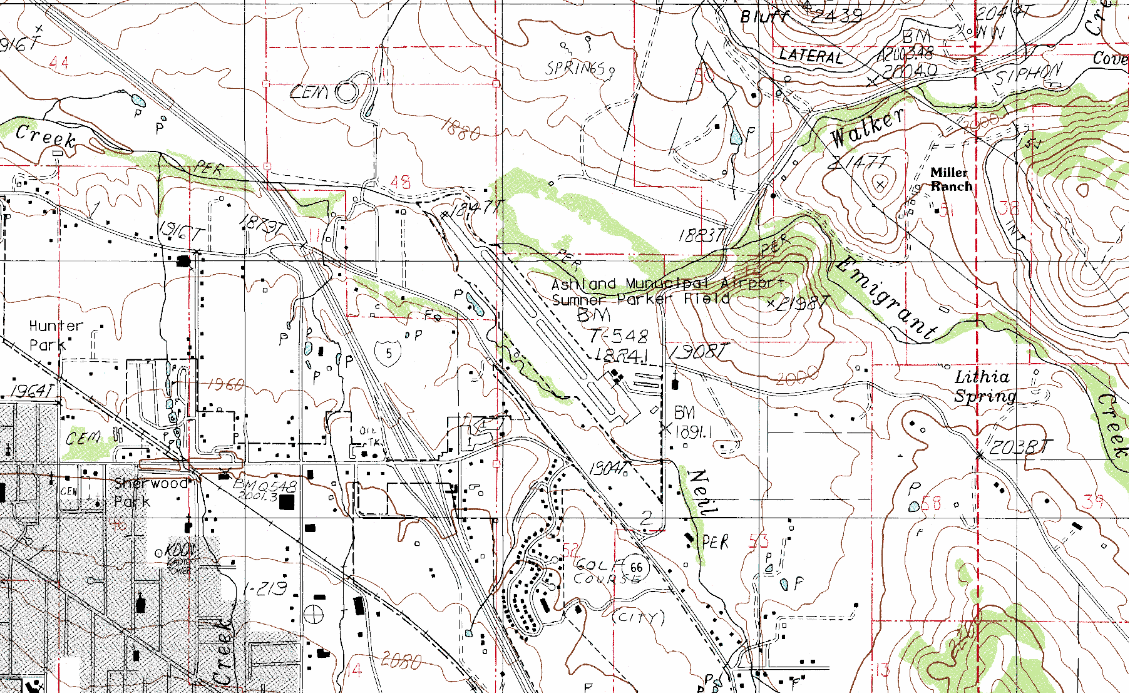
- orthophoto of Ashland Municipal Airport
- IATA: AHM; ICAO: none; FAA LID: S03

Summary
- Airport type: Public
- Owner: City of Ashland
- Serves: Ashland, Oregon
- Elevation AMSL: 1,889 ft (576 m)
- Coordinates: 42°11′25″N 122°39′38″W

Map
- Location within Oregon

Runways
Direction	Length		Surface
Direction	ft	m	Surface
12/30	3,603	1,098	Asphalt

Statistics (2021)
- Aircraft operations (year ending 5/11/2021): 26,050
- Based aircraft: 62
- Source: Federal Aviation Administration

Ashland Municipal Airport (Sumner Parker Field) (IATA: AHM, FAA LID: S03) is two miles east of Ashland, in Jackson County, Oregon. The National Plan of Integrated Airport Systems for 2011 through 2015 categorized it as a general aviation facility.

== Facilities ==
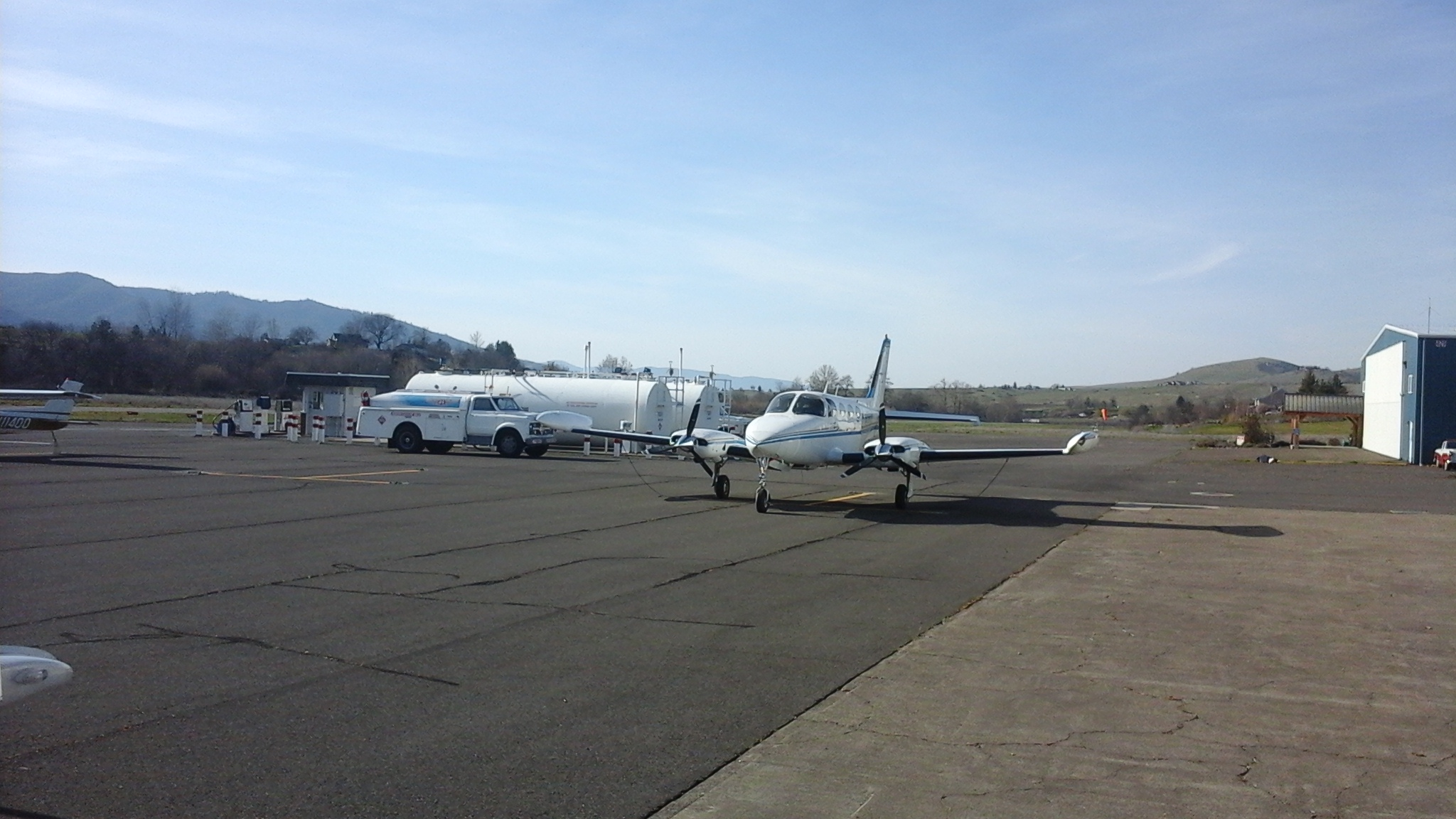
Ashland Municipal Airport runway

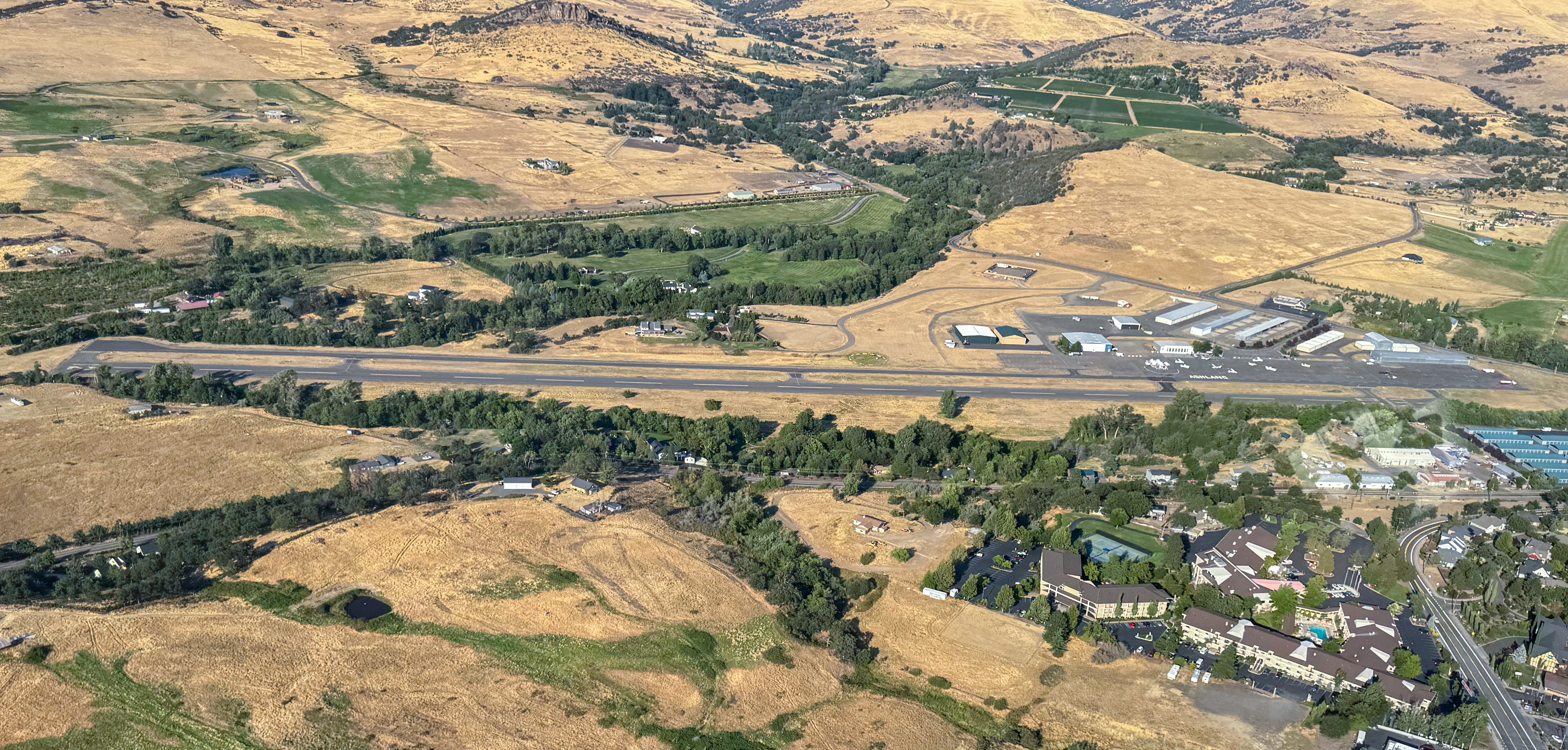
Aerial view of the airport

The airport covers 94 acres (38 ha) at an elevation of 1,889 feet (576 m). Its one runway, 12/30, is 3,603 by 75 feet (1,098 x 23 m).

In the year ending May 11, 2021, the airport had 26,050 aircraft operations, average 71 per day: 94% general aviation, 6% air taxi, and <1% military. 60 aircraft were then based at the airport: 52 single-engine, 5 helicopter, 1 multi-engine, 1 jet, and 1 glider.
