= Levitical priesthood =

Levitical priesthood may refer to:

- Aaronic priesthood (Latter Day Saints), an order of priesthood in Latter Day Saint movement churches
- Kohen, the priestly families in Judaism
- Levite, a male of the tribe of Levi

== See also ==
- Aaronic priesthood (disambiguation)
