= Grammatical modifier =

Optional element in phrase or clause structure

In linguistics, a modifier is an optional element in phrase structure or clause structure which modifies the meaning of another element in the structure. For instance, the adjective "red" acts as a modifier in the noun phrase "red ball", providing extra details about which particular ball is being referred to. Similarly, the adverb "quickly" acts as a modifier in the verb phrase "run quickly". Modification can be considered a high-level domain of the functions of language, on par with predication and reference.

== Premodifiers and postmodifiers ==
Modifiers may come either before or after the modified element (the head), depending on the type of modifier and the rules of syntax for the language in question. A modifier placed before the head is called a premodifier; one placed after the head is called a postmodifier. For example, in land mines, the word land is a premodifier of mines, whereas in the phrase mines in wartime, the phrase in wartime is a postmodifier of mines. A head may have a number of modifiers, and these may include both premodifiers and postmodifiers. For example:

- that nice tall man from Canada whom you met

In this noun phrase, man is the head, nice and tall are premodifiers, and from Canada and whom you met are postmodifiers.

In English, simple adjectives are usually used as premodifiers, with occasional exceptions such as galore (which always appears after the noun, coming from Irish in which most adjectives are postmodifiers) or the adjectives immemorial and martial in the phrases time immemorial and court martial (the latter comes from French, where most adjectives are postmodifiers). Sometimes placement of the adjective after the noun entails a change of meaning: compare a responsible person and the person responsible, or the proper town (the appropriate town) and the town proper (the area of the town as properly defined).

In English (and other languages) a modifier can be separated from its head by other modifiers, making the phrase discontinuous, as in The man here whom you bumped into in the street yesterday, where the relative clause whom...yesterday is separated from the word it modifies (man) by the modifier here. In some other languages, words other than modifiers may occur in between; this type of situation is especially likely in languages with free word order, and often agreement between the grammatical gender, number or other feature of the modifier and its head is used to indicate the relationship. In English, modifiers may sometimes even be interposed between component words or syllables of the head, such as in split infinitives (to boldly go) or infixation, most commonly expletive infixation (in-fucking-credible).

== Types ==
=== Formal types ===
Two common parts of speech used for modification are adjectives (and adjectival phrases and adjectival clauses), which modify nouns; and adverbs (and adverbial phrases and adverbial clauses), which modify other parts of speech, particularly verbs, adjectives and other adverbs, as well as whole phrases or clauses. Not all adjectives and adverbs are necessarily modifiers, however; an adjective will normally be considered a modifier when used attributively, but not when used predicatively – compare the examples with the adjective red at the start of this article.

Another type of modifier in some languages, including English, is the noun adjunct, which is a noun modifying another noun (or occasionally another part of speech). An example is land in the phrase land mines given above.

Examples of the above types of modifiers, in English, are given below.

- It was [a nice house]. (adjective modifying a noun, in a noun phrase)
- [The swiftly flowing waters] carried it away. (adjectival phrase, in this case a participial phrase, modifying a noun in a noun phrase)
- She's [the woman with the hat]. (adjectival phrase, in this case a prepositional phrase, modifying a noun in a noun phrase)
- I saw [the man whom we met yesterday]. (adjectival clause, in this case a relative clause, modifying a noun in a noun phrase)
- His desk was in [the faculty office]. (noun adjunct modifying a noun in a noun phrase)
- [Put it gently in the drawer]. (adverb in verb phrase)
- He was [very gentle]. (adverb in adjective phrase)
- She set it down [very gently]. (adverb in adverb phrase)
- [Even more] people were there. (adverb modifying a determiner)
- It ran [right up the tree]. (adverb modifying a prepositional phrase)
- [Only the dog] was saved. (adverb modifying a noun phrase)

In some cases, noun phrases or quantifiers can act as modifiers:

- [A few more] workers are needed. (quantifier modifying a determiner)
- She's [two inches taller than her sister]. (noun phrase modifying an adjective)

=== Functional types ===
Modifiers of all types of forms may be used for certain function with different semantic features. The grammar of a language determines which morpho-syntactic forms are used for which function, as it varies from language to language. The functions of modification can be grouped into five such types:

- Classifying modification further specifies the kind of a referent: e.g. solar energy, departmental meeting.
- Qualifying modification further specifies some quality of a referent: e.g. black cars, a heavy box.
- Quantifying modification specifies the quantity (or number/cardinality) of a referent: e.g. two boxes, several cars.
- Localizing (or anchoring) modification specifies the location of a referent: e.g. this car, the house on the corner.
- Discourse-referential modification specifies the status of the referent in the discourse universe: e.g. the/a car.

== Ambiguous and dangling modifiers ==
Sometimes it is not clear which element of the sentence a modifier is intended to modify. In many cases this is not important, but in some cases it can lead to genuine ambiguity. For example:

- He painted her sitting on the step.

Here the participial phrase sitting on the step may be intended to modify her (meaning that the painting's subject was sitting on the step), or it may be intended to modify the verb phrase painted her or the whole clause he painted her (or just he), meaning in effect that it was the painter who was sitting on the step.

Sometimes the element which the modifier is intended to modify does not in fact appear in the sentence, or is not in an appropriate position to be associated with that modifier. This is often considered a grammatical or stylistic error. For example:

- Walking along the road, a vulture loomed overhead.

Here whoever was "walking along the road" is not mentioned in the sentence, so the modifier (walking along the road) has nothing to modify, except a vulture, which is clearly not the intention. Such a case is called a "dangling modifier", or more specifically, in the common case where (as here) the modifier is a participial phrase, a "dangling participle".

== See also ==
- Description
- Intensifier
- Intersective modifier
- Privative adjective
- Subsective modifier
