= Question under discussion =

In semantics, pragmatics, and philosophy of language, a question under discussion (QUD) is a question which the interlocutors in a discourse are attempting to answer. In many formal and computational theories of discourse, the QUD (or an ordered set of QUD's) is among the elements of a tuple called the conversational scoreboard which represents the current state of the conversation. Craige Roberts introduced the concept of a QUD in 1996 in order to formalize conversational relevance and explain its consequences for information structure and focus marking. It has subsequently become a staple of work in semantics and pragmatics, playing a role in analyses of disparate phenomena including donkey anaphora and presupposition projection.

== See also ==
- Common ground (linguistics)
- Cooperative principle
- Discourse
- Focus (linguistics)
