= Modal subordination =

Formal semantic phenomenon

In formal semantics and pragmatics, modal subordination is the phenomenon whereby a modal expression is interpreted relative to another modal expression to which it is not syntactically subordinate. For instance, the following example does not assert that the birds will in fact be hungry, but rather that hungry birds would be a consequence of Joan forgetting to fill the birdfeeder. This interpretation was unexpected in early theories of the syntax-semantics interface since the content concerning the birds' hunger occurs in a separate sentence from the if-clause.

1. If Joan forgets to fill the birdfeeder, she will feel very bad. The birds will get hungry.

Instances of modal subordination have been found in a variety of languages with a variety of other modal operators including epistemic modal auxiliaries, deontic modal auxiliaries, negation, habituals, and evidentials. Some English examples are given below.

1. A wolf might walk in. It would growl.
2. Maxine should become a carpenter. Her friends would discover she could build things, and she'd be very popular on weekends.
3. Mary didn’t buy a microwave. She would never use it.
4. Don't go near that bomb! I'll explode!
5. John used to read a book every day. He would start it as he drank his coffee and finish it on the bus ride home.

The phenomenon modal subordination was discovered and first analyzed by Craige Roberts. In her 1987 dissertation, she argued against an analysis where the modally subordinated content is inserted under the semantic scope of the earlier modal expression, instead proposing that the phenomenon be understood in terms of implicit domain restriction. On this account, the compositional semantics does not fully determine the domain of quantification for modal expressions, and modal subordination is the result of the domain for the later expression being identified with that of the earlier one. Subsequent work has argued that Roberts' original account is too unconstrained and thus wrongly predicts that modal subordination should be possible in cases where the data suggest it is impossible. Many recent analyses treat modal subordination as a form of anaphora involving propositional or temporal discourse referents. Such accounts are often couched in variants of dynamic semantics such as DRT and SDRT.

== See also ==
- Linguistic modality
- Anaphora (linguistics)
- Conditional sentence
- Modal logic
- Discourse representation theory
- Craige Roberts
