= Modal word =

Type of word that is used to indicate modality, such as "might"

Modal words are words in a language that express modality, i.e., possibility, necessity, or contingency. One kind of modal word is the modal verb (should, can, might, and ought, as well as oblige, need, and require). Other types of modal words in English include modal adjectives (likely, probable, necessary), modal adverbs (probably, perhaps, certainly), modal prepositions (despite, unless, if), and modal nouns (possibility, probability, certainty).
