= Mandy Simons =

American linguist

Academic background
- Education: Cornell University (PhD)
- Doctoral advisor: Sally McConnell-Ginet

Academic work
- Discipline: Linguistics
- Sub-discipline: Semantics, Pragmatics
- Website: CMU faculty page

Mandy Simons is a linguist and professor in the Department of Philosophy at Carnegie Mellon University (CMU). She researches semantics and pragmatics, in particular phenomena like presupposition and projection.

== Biography ==
Simons earned her PhD in linguistics at Cornell in 1998 with a dissertation entitled, "Or: Issues in the Semantics and Pragmatics of Disjunction." She joined the faculty at CMU in 1998, and also holds an adjunct position at the University of Pittsburgh's Department of Linguistics.

== Awards ==
In 2013, her paper, "Toward a taxonomy of projective content," coauthored with Judith Tonhauser, David Beaver, and Craige Roberts won the 2013 Best Paper in Language (journal) Award from the Linguistic Society of America.

== Selected publications ==
- Simons, Mandy (1 June 2007). "Observations on embedding verbs, evidentiality, and presupposition". Lingua. 117 (6): 1034–1056. doi:10.1016/j.lingua.2006.05.006.
- Simons, Mandy; Tonhauser, Judith; Beaver, David; Roberts, Craige (14 August 2010). "What projects and why". Semantics and Linguistic Theory. 20: 309–327. doi:10.3765/salt.v20i0.2584.
- Tonhauser, Judith; Beaver, David; Roberts, Craige; Simons, Mandy (2013). "Toward a Taxonomy of Projective Content". Language. 89 (1): 66–109. doi:10.1353/lan.2013.0001. S2CID 50243.
