= David Beaver =

American linguist and philosopher

David Ian Beaver
- Education: University of Edinburgh
- Occupation(s): Linguist; Professor
- Notable work: Presupposition and Assertion in Dynamic Semantics

David Ian Beaver is a professor of linguistics and philosophy at the University of Texas at Austin, where he also directs the cognitive science program and serves as Graduate Studies Advisor of the Human Dimensions of Organizations Master's program. His work concerns the semantics and pragmatics of natural language, including, in particular, research on presupposition, anaphora, topic and focus.

== Education and career ==
Beaver received a B.Sc. in 1988 from the Departments of Physics and Philosophy at the University of Bristol, an M.Sc. in 1989 from the Department of Artificial Intelligence at the University of Edinburgh, and a Ph.D. in 1995 from the Centre for Cognitive Science also at the University of Edinburgh, where his principal advisor was Ewan Klein and his secondary advisor was Robin Cooper. Beaver was an assistant professor (1997–2005) and an associate professor (2005–2007) at Stanford University before he was hired as an associate professor by the University of Texas at Austin in 2007. Beaver was promoted to full professor by UT Austin in 2011.

== Research ==
In addition to his work in formal semantics and pragmatics, Beaver contributes to research on the social dimensions of language use, a topic of quite general interest as evidenced by a 29 October 2011 New York Times op-ed by Ben Zimmer, which discusses Beaver's work on sentiment in Arab Spring tweets.

== Honors ==
Beaver's 2013 paper "Toward a taxonomy of projective content," coauthored with Judith Tonhauser, Craige Roberts, and Mandy Simons, won the 2013 Best Paper in Language Award from the Linguistic Society of America.

== Books ==
- Beaver, David. 2001. Presupposition and Assertion in Dynamic Semantics. Stanford: CSLI Publications.
- Beaver, David and Brady Clark. 2008. Sense and Sensitivity: How Focus Determines Meaning. Oxford: Blackwell.
