= Den Burg =

- Town
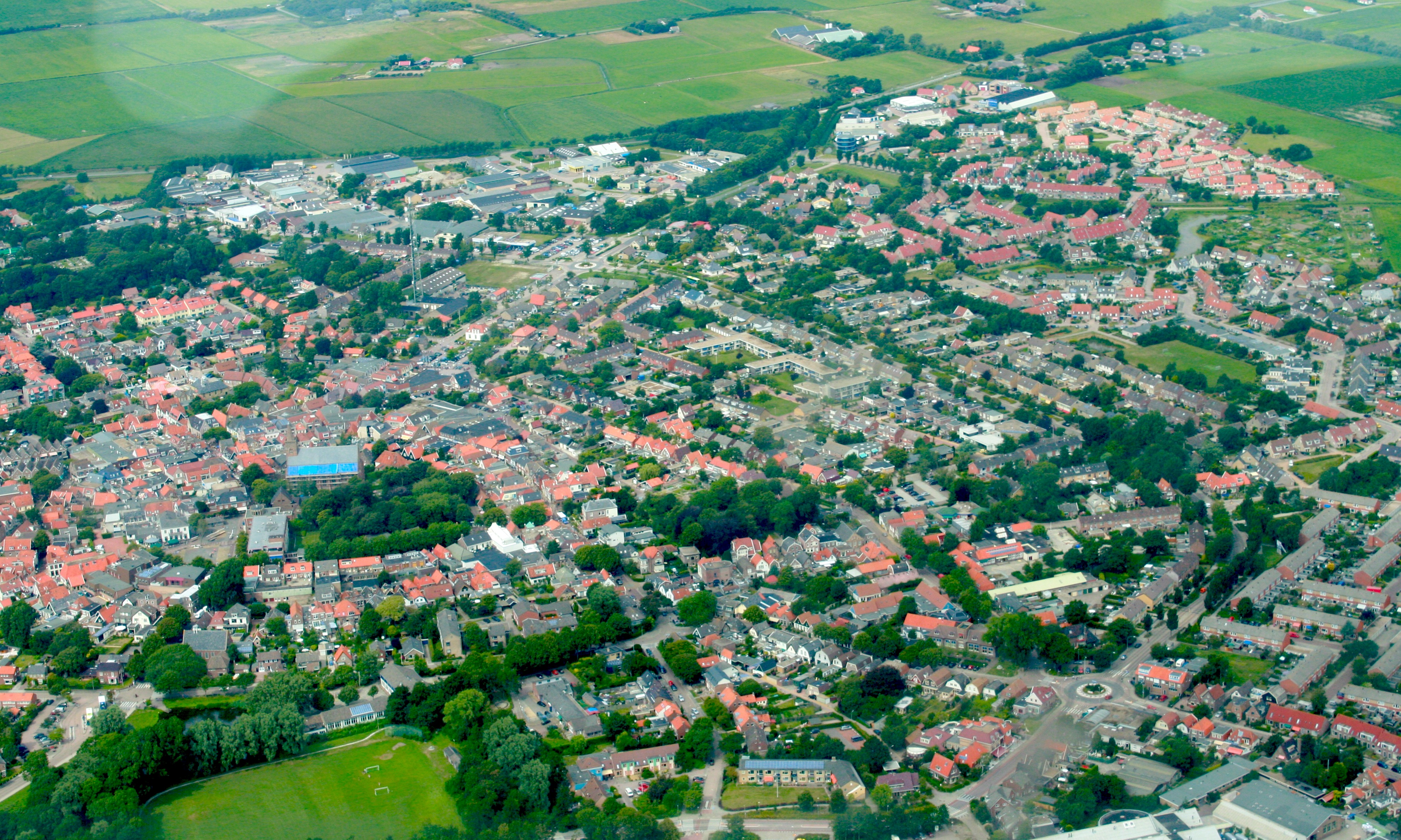
- Aerial view of Den Burg

- Location in the Netherlands Location in the province of North Holland in the Netherlands
- Country: Netherlands
- Province: North Holland
- Municipality: Texel

Area
  - Total: 2.58 km^{2} (1.00 sq mi)
- Elevation: 1.9 m (6.2 ft)

Population (2025)
  - Total: 6,790
  - Density: 2,630/km^{2} (6,820/sq mi)
- Time zone: UTC+1 (CET)
  - Summer (DST): UTC+2 (CEST)
- Postal code: 1791
- Dialing code: 0222

Den Burg is a town in the Dutch province of North Holland. It is a part of the municipality of Texel on the island of the same name, and lies about 12 km north of Den Helder.

== Overview ==
Located in the middle of the island, Den Burg is the largest town of Texel. It features a historic centre and also the town hall. Outdoor markets are held each week in the main square. Nevertheless, Den Burg is the island's least tourist settlement.

The town was first mentioned between 918 and 948 as Osterburghem, and means "castle" which refers to a castle built to defend against the Vikings.

== Notable sites ==
The Dutch Reformed church is a three aisled basilica-like church with 11th century elements. The tower dates from the mid 15th century. After a lightning strike in 1537, it was enlarged. The Oudheidkamer was built in 1599 as guest house and nowadays contains a museum.

A monument to the constructed language, Esperanto, is on the corner of Kogerstraat and De Zes. It was constructed in 1935 when Esperanto was widely spoken throughout the island.

== Notable people ==
- Willem Eduard Bok (1846–1904), State Secretary of the South African Republic (Transvaal) 1880–1889.
- Kees de Jager (1921–2021), astronomer. He was the general secretary of the IAU from 1967 to 1973 and former director of the observatory at Utrecht.
- Hans Kamp (born 1940), philosopher, creator of discourse representation theory (DRT).
- Henk Zijm (born 1952), mathematician, professor and Rector Magnificus (2005–2008) at the University of Twente.
- Dorian van Rijsselberghe (born 1988), windsurfer, winner of gold medal in the 2012 and 2016 Olympics.

== Gallery ==
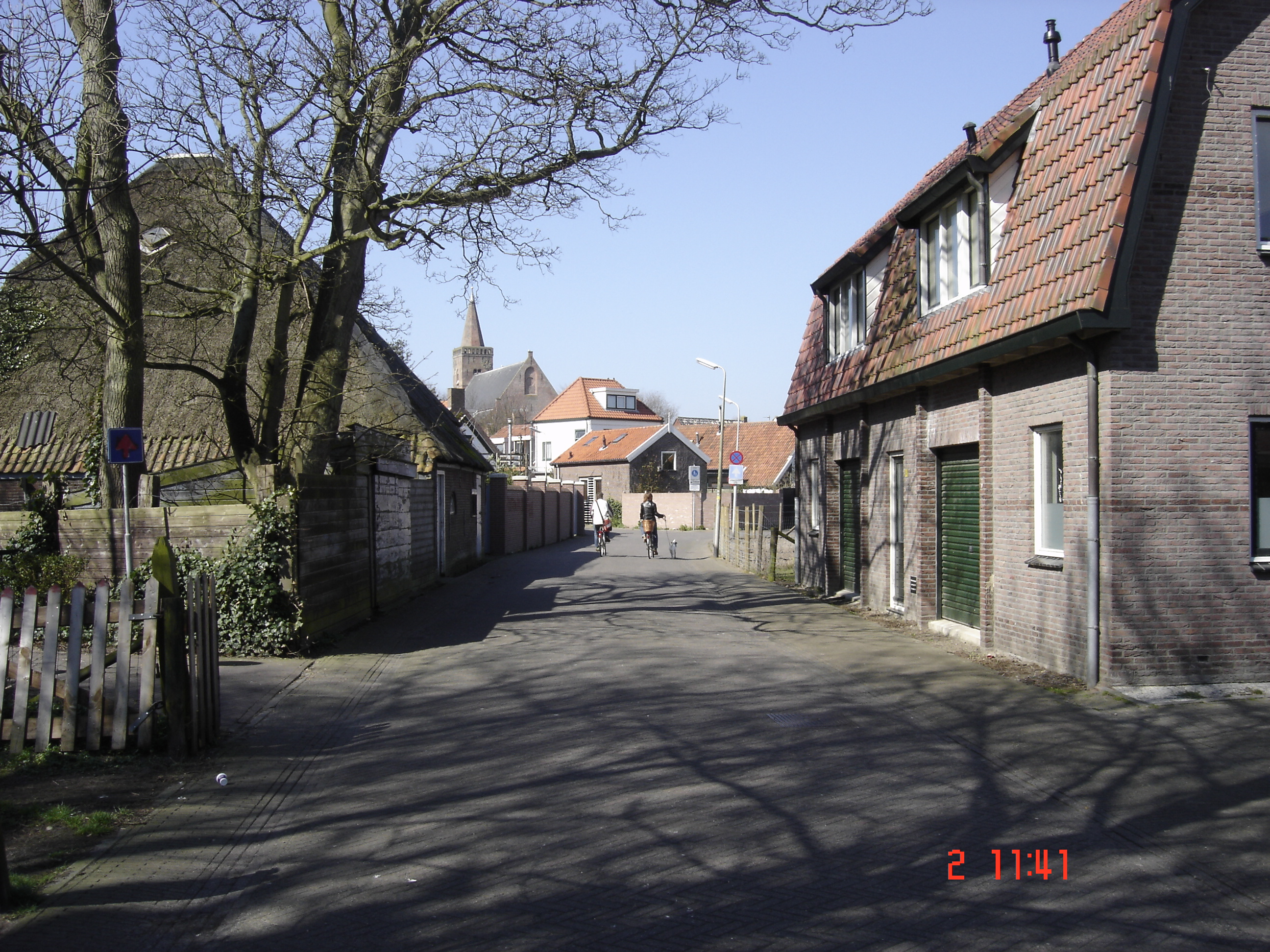
Street in Den Burg, with the church in the background.

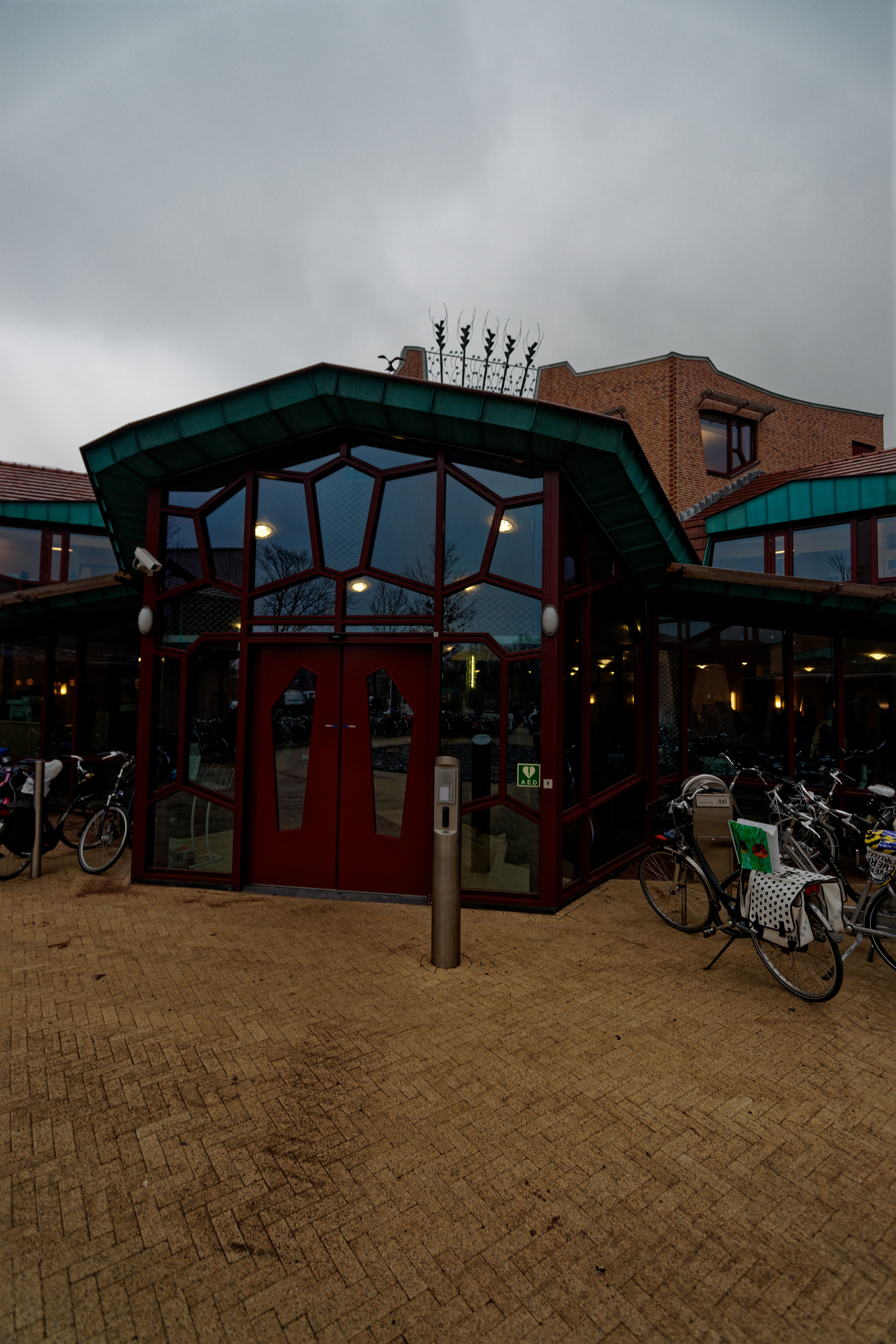
Town hall

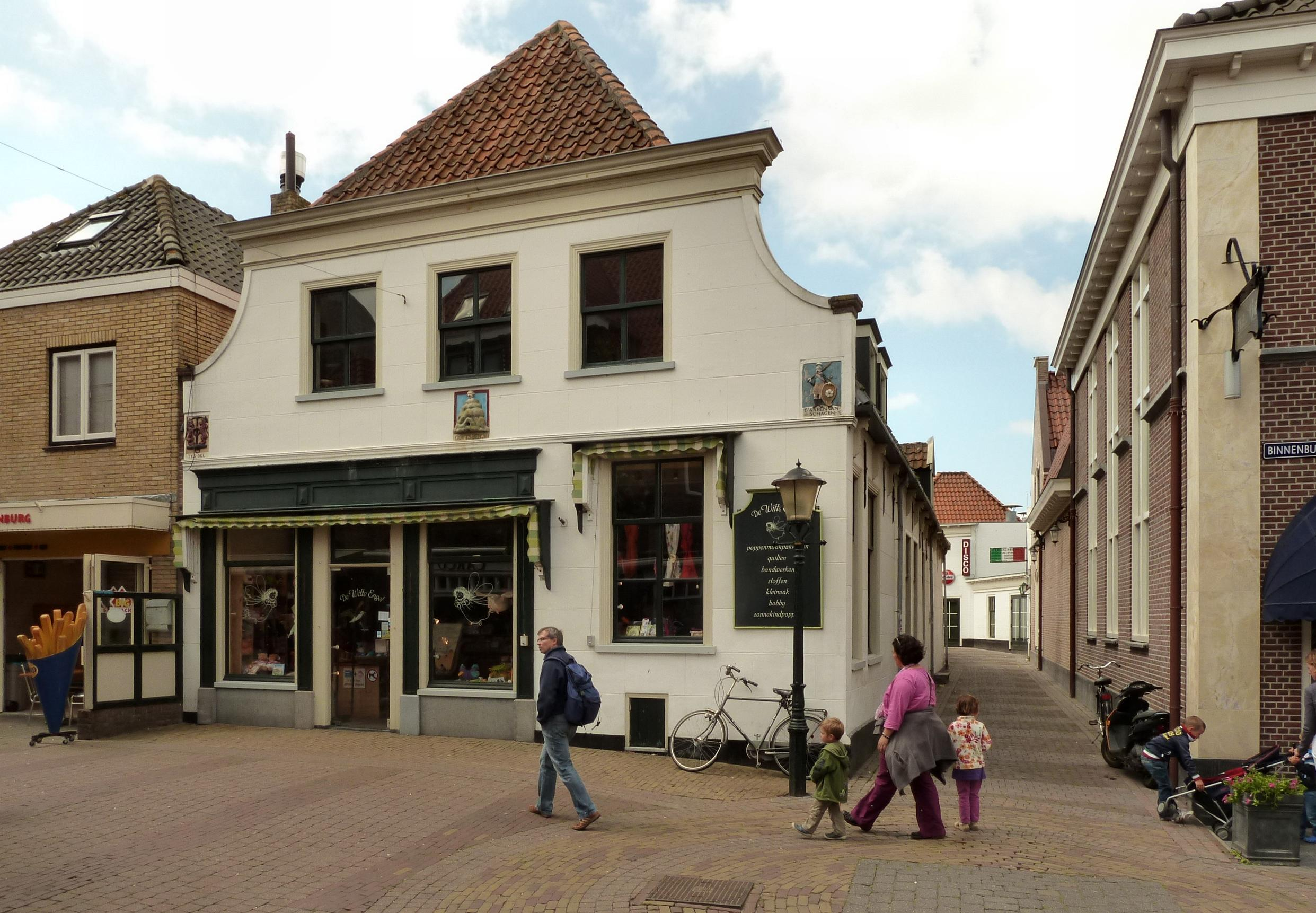
Shop in Den Burg

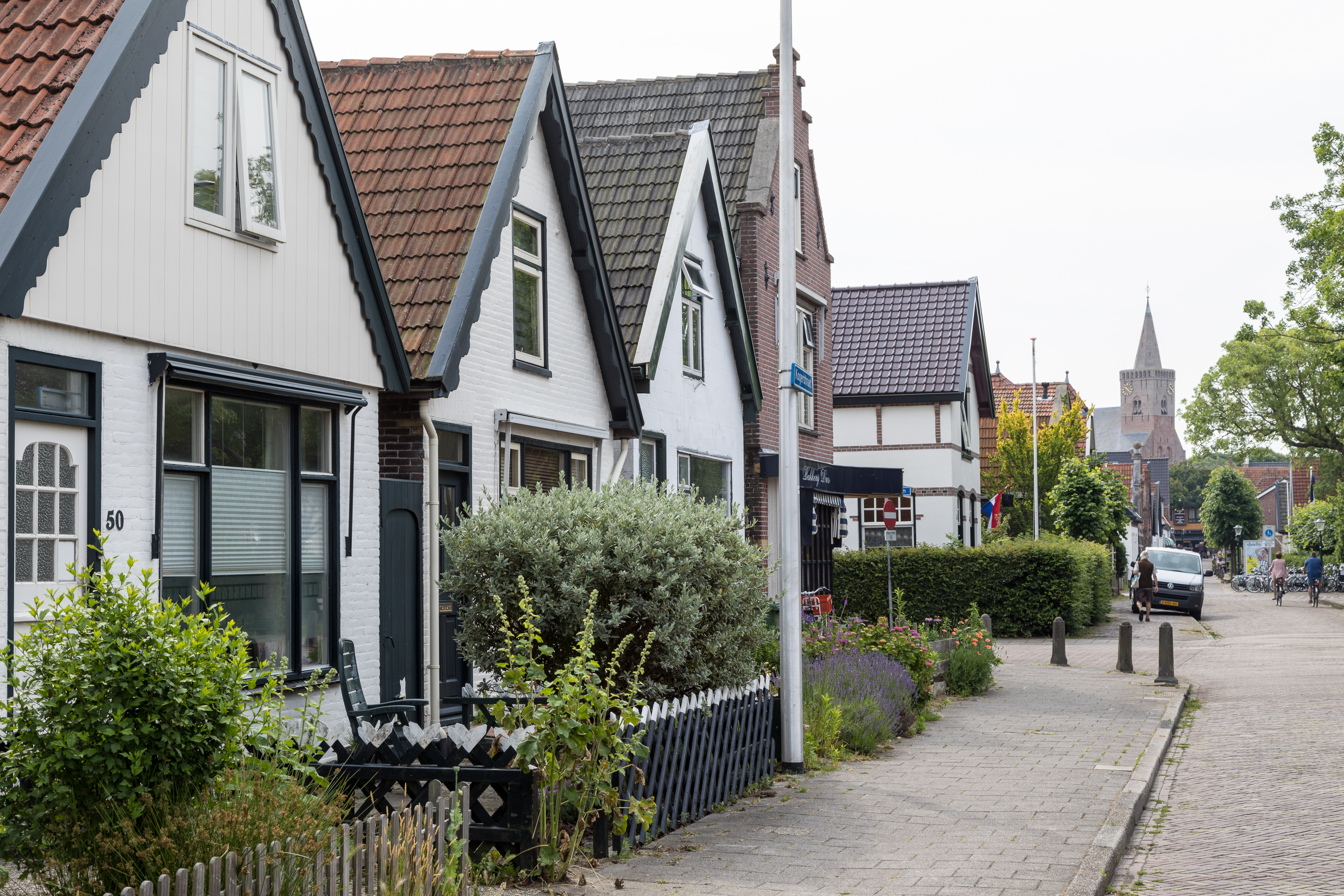
Kogerstraat and church

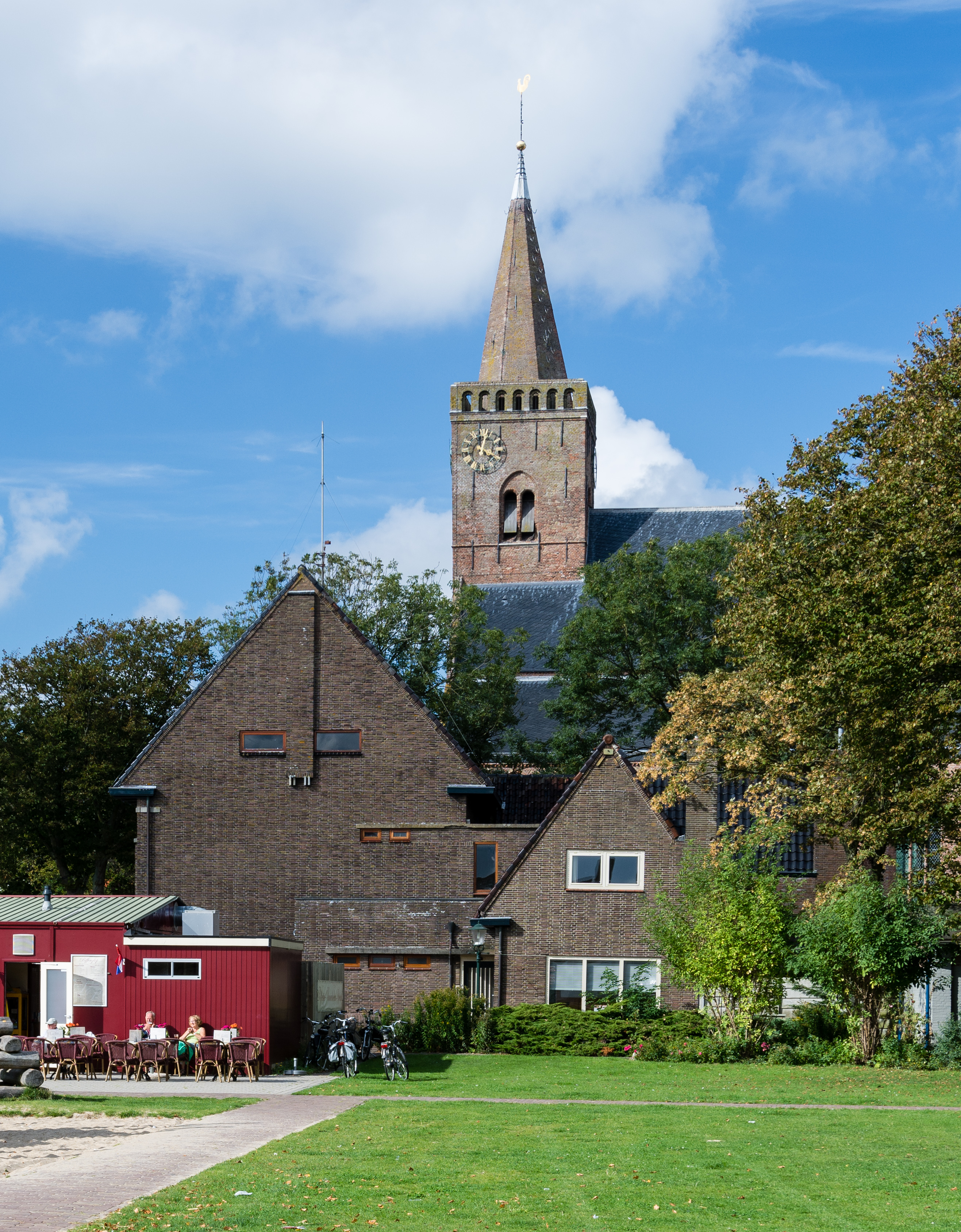
Dutch Reformed church

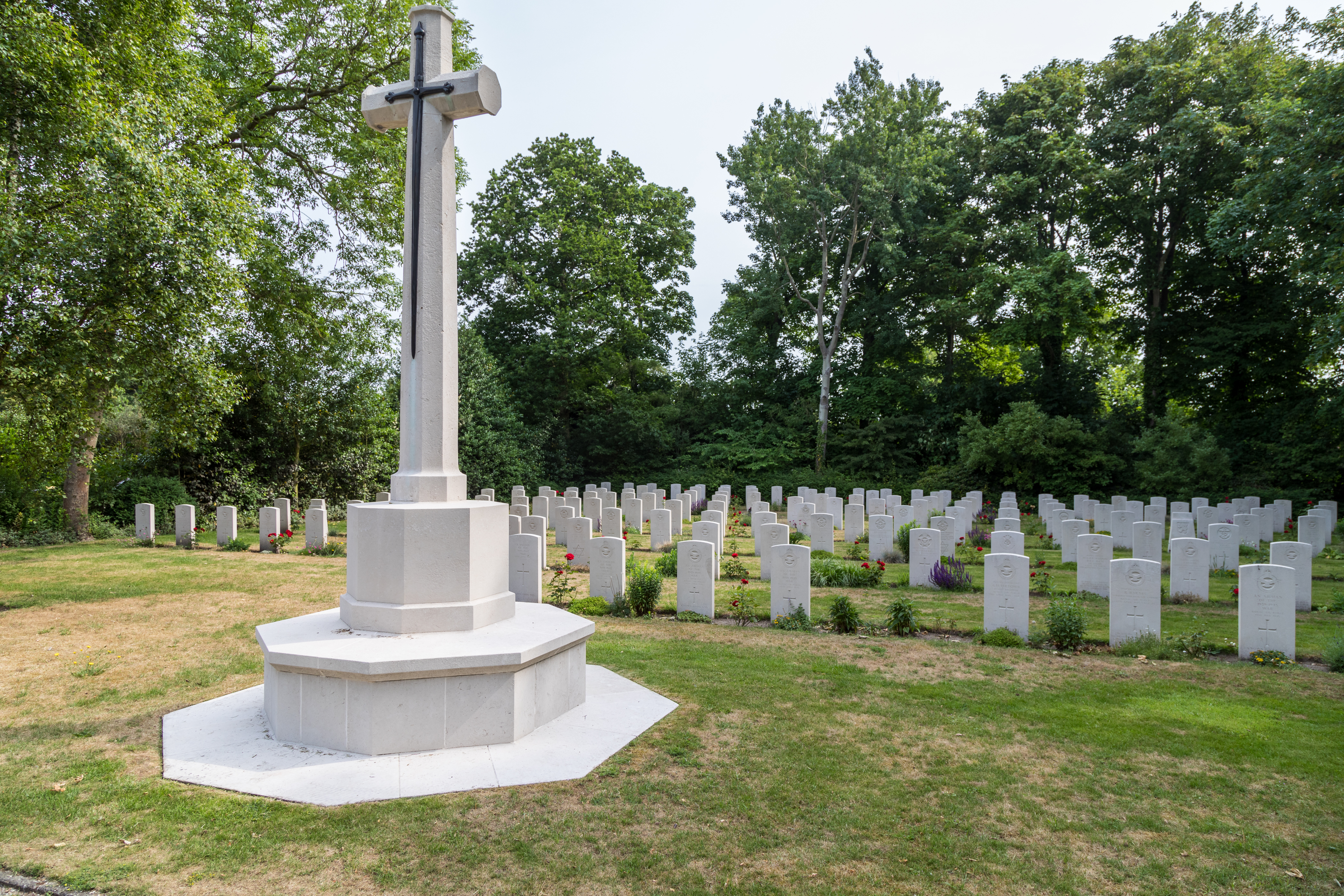
Allied war graves
