= Modal adverb =

Type of adverb that is used to indicate modality, such as "probably"

Modal adverbs are adverbs, such as probably, necessarily, and possibly that express modality, i.e., possibility, necessity, or contingency.

== In English ==
The Cambridge Grammar of the English Language provides the following non-exhaustive list of modal adverbs at different levels of strength.

Strong: assuredly, certainly, clearly, definitely, incontestably, indubitably, ineluctably, inescapably, manifestly, necessarily, obviously, patently, plainly, surely, truly, unarguably, unavoidably, undeniably, undoubtedly, unquestionably

Quasi-strong: apparently, doubtless, evidently, presumably, seemingly

Medium: arguably, likely, probably

Weak: conceivably, maybe, perhaps, possibly

=== Syntax and meaning ===
Modal adverbs often appear as clause-initial adjuncts, and have scope over the whole clause, as in (1) with the adverb in bold.

1. **Probably**, the biggest push for corruption prosecutions came in the mid-2000s.

This has the same meaning as (2) with the paraphrase using the modal adjective (in bold).

2. It is **probable** that the biggest push for corruption prosecutions came in the mid-2000s.

Without the comma, the adverb has scope only over the NP, as in (3).

3. **Probably** the biggest push for corruption prosecutions came in the mid-2000s.

This can be paraphrased as (4).

4. It is **probable** that push for corruption prosecutions that came in the mid-2000s was the biggest such push.

There is a tendency for modal adverbs to follow auxiliary verbs but precede lexical verbs, as shown in (5–8) with the adverbs in bold and the verbs underlined.

5. That's **probably** going to fail.
6. That **probably** failed because of poor planning.
7. It could **possibly** help me.
8. It **possibly** helped me.

== See also ==
- Modal word
