= Judith Tonhauser =

Professor of English Linguistics

- Education: Ph.D in Linguistics
- Employer: University of Stuttgart
- Known for: work on Paraguayan Guaraní, cross-linguistic variation in semantics/pragmatics, nominal tense and anaphora presupposition projection

Judith Tonhauser is a Professor of English Linguistics and Vice Rector for Early Career Researchers and Diversity at the University of Stuttgart.

== Education and career ==
Tonhauser received her Ph.D. in Linguistics from Stanford University in 2006. Her dissertation was titled The Temporal Semantics of Noun Phrases: Evidence from Guaraní. From 2006 to 2020, she was on the faculty of the Linguistics department at The Ohio State University. Since 2020 she has been Professor and Chair of English Linguistics and since 2024 a Vice Rector at the University of Stuttgart.

Tonhauser's research interests include Presupposition projection, Prosody and Meaning, Temporal Anaphora and Reference, and empirical methods in Semantics and Pragmatics. She is known for her work in theoretical semantics and pragmatics, specifically on cross-linguistic semantic/pragmatic variation. To this end, she has investigated languages which are under-represented in linguistic theory like the Paraguayan Guarani language, a Tupí Guaraní language spoken in Paraguay and surrounding countries.

== Awards and distinctions ==
Tonhauser is the recipient of the 2016 Early Career Award from the Linguistic Society of America. The award recognizes scholars early in their career who have made outstanding contributions to the field of linguistics.

Tonhauser's 2013 paper, "Toward a taxonomy of projective content," coauthored with David Beaver, Craige Roberts, and Mandy Simons, won the 2013 Best Paper in Language (journal) Award from the Linguistic Society of America.

In 2013, she was awarded an ACLS Frederick Burkhardt Residential Fellowship for Recently Tenured Scholars for her project Content and Context in the Study of Meaning Variation.

She is an Associate Editor of Semantics and Pragmatics, a journal of the Linguistic Society of America.

== Selected publications ==
- Tonhauser, Judith (2007). "Nominal Tense? The Meaning of Guaraní Nominal Temporal Markers". Language. 83 (4): 831–869. doi:10.1353/lan.2008.0037. JSTOR 40070967. S2CID 50797962.
- Tonhauser, Judith (2008-01-01). "Defining crosslinguistic categories: The case of nominal tense (Reply to Nordlinger and Sadler)*". Language. 84 (2): 332–342. doi:10.1353/lan.0.0017. ISSN 1535-0665. S2CID 144511555.
- Lee, Jungmee; Tonhauser, Judith (2010-08-01). "Temporal Interpretation without Tense: Korean and Japanese Coordination Constructions". Journal of Semantics. 27 (3): 307–341. doi:10.1093/jos/ffq005. ISSN 0167-5133.
- Tonhauser, Judith; Colijn, Erika (2010). "Word Order in Paraguayan Guaraní". International Journal of American Linguistics. 76 (2): 255–288. doi:10.1086/652267. JSTOR 10.1086/652267. S2CID 73554080.
- Tonhauser, Judith (2011-11-03). "Temporal reference in Paraguayan Guaraní, a tenseless language". Linguistics and Philosophy. 34 (3): 257–303. doi:10.1007/s10988-011-9097-2. ISSN 0165-0157. S2CID 62125736.
- Shain, Cory; Tonhauser, Judith (2010-10-01). "The synchrony and diachrony of differential object marking in Paraguayan Guaraní". Language Variation and Change. 22 (3): 321–346. doi:10.1017/S0954394510000153. ISSN 1469-8021. S2CID 146152550.
- Tonhauser, Judith; Beaver, David; Roberts, Craige; Simons, Mandy (2013-01-01). "Toward a Taxonomy of Projective Content". Language. 89 (1): 66–109. doi:10.1353/lan.2013.0001. ISSN 1535-0665. S2CID 50243.
- Clopper, Cynthia G.; Tonhauser, Judith (2013). "The Prosody of Focus in Paraguayan Guaraní". International Journal of American Linguistics. 79 (2): 219–251. doi:10.1086/669629. JSTOR 10.1086/669629. S2CID 143244853.
- Turnbull, Rory; Burdin, Rachel Steindel; Clopper, Cynthia G.; Tonhauser, Judith (5 August 2015). "Contextual predictability and the prosodic realisation of focus: a cross-linguistic comparison". Language, Cognition and Neuroscience. 30 (9): 1061–1076. doi:10.1080/23273798.2015.1071856. S2CID 145386394.
- Burdin, Rachel Steindel; Phillips-Bourass, Sara; Turnbull, Rory; Yasavul, Murat; Clopper, Cynthia G.; Tonhauser, Judith (2015-10-01). "Variation in the prosody of focus in head- and head/edge-prominence languages". Lingua. Prosody and Information Status in Typological Perspective. 165, Part B: 254–276. doi:10.1016/j.lingua.2014.10.001.
- Tonhauser, Judith (2015-01-01). "Cross-Linguistic Temporal Reference". Annual Review of Linguistics. 1 (1): 129–154. doi:10.1146/annurev-linguist-030514-124923.
- Tonhauser, Judith (2015-02-01). "Are 'informative presuppositions' presuppositions?". Language and Linguistics Compass. 9 (2): 77–101. doi:10.1111/lnc3.12119. ISSN 1749-818X.
