= Double-barreled question =

Type of informal fallacy

A double-barreled question (sometimes, double-direct question) is an informal fallacy. It is committed when someone asks a question that touches upon more than one issue, yet allows only for one answer. This may result in inaccuracies in the attitudes being measured for the question, as the respondent can answer only one of the two questions, and cannot indicate which one is being answered.

Many double-barreled questions can be detected by the existence of the grammatical conjunction "and" in them. This is not a foolproof test, as the word "and" can exist in properly constructed questions.

A question asking about three items is known as "trible (triple, treble)-barreled". In legal proceedings, a double-barreled question is called a compound question.

== Examples ==
An example of a double-barreled question would be the following: "do you think that students should have more classes about history and culture?" This question asks about two different issues: "do you think that students should have more classes about history" and "do you think that students should have more classes about culture?" Combining both questions into one makes it unclear what exactly is being measured, and as each question may elicit a different response if asked separately there is an increased likelihood of confusing the respondents. In other words, while some respondents would answer "yes" to both and some "no" to both, some would like to answer both "yes and no".

Other examples of double-barreled questions:

- "Please agree or disagree with the following statement: Cars should be faster and safer."
- "How satisfied are you with your pay and job conditions?"
- "How often and how much time do you spend on each visit to a hospital?"
- "Does your department have a special recruitment policy for men and women?"
- "Do you think that there is a good market for the product and that it will sell well?"
- "Should the government spend less money on the military and more on education?"
- "Is this tool interesting and useful?"

Buttering-up is a type of a double-barreled question. It happens when one of the questions is a question that the questioned person will want to answer "yes" to, and another that the questioner hopes will be answered with the same "yes". For example, "Would you be a nice guy and lend me five bucks?"

Some questions may not be double-barreled but confusingly similar enough to a double-barreled question to result in similar issues. For example, the question "Should the organization reduce paperwork required of employees by hiring more administrators?" can be interpreted as composed of two questions: "Should the organization reduce paperwork required of employees?" and "Should the organization hire more administrators?"

Double-barreled questions have been asked by professionals, resulting in notable skewed media reports and research pieces. For example, Harris Poll used double-barreled questions in the 1980s, investigating the US public opinion on Libya–United States relations, and American attitudes toward Mikhail Gorbachev.

== U.S. trial usage ==
In a legal trial, a compound question may raise an objection, as the witness may be unable to provide a clear answer to the inquiry.

One guide to trial practice offers the following example of a compound question:

Cross-examiner: As you approached the intersection, did you look down, change the radio station, and then look up and for the first time notice the oncoming car?
Opponent: Objection, compound question.

An example in practice has been cited in the case of Weise v. Rainville (1959) 173 CA2d 496, 506, where the objection to such a question was sustained because such a question "raises the danger that the witness does not intend to reply to both questions" when answering "yes" to the compound question. It may also be unclear to the court, jurors, or appellate bodies, what the witness intended in answering the question; and such a question may combine a request for relevant information with a request for information that is irrelevant or inadmissible. If the question is one for which the answer will not be harmful to the opposing attorney's case, then the attorney need not object at all; alternatively, the opposing attorney may object, and specify when objecting that he would not object to a rephrasing of the question into separate, non-compound parts.

Compound questions are most frequently asked during cross-examination.

== In popular culture ==
On his album Mitch All Together, Mitch Hedberg jokes about a supposed double-barreled question on his health insurance form: "Have you ever used sugar or PCP?"

== See also ==
- Complex question
- Fallacy of many questions
- Implicature
- Leading question
- Loaded question
- Mu (negative)
- Persuasive definition
- Poisoning the well
- Presupposition
- Self-refuting idea
