= Discourse =

Field of theory which examines elements of conversation

Discourse is a generalization of the notion of a conversation to any form of communication. Discourse is a major topic in social theory, with work spanning fields such as sociology, anthropology, continental philosophy, and discourse analysis. Following work by Michel Foucault, these fields view discourse as a system of thought, knowledge, or communication that constructs our world experience. Since control of discourse amounts to control of how the world is perceived, social theory often studies discourse as a window into power. Within theoretical linguistics, discourse is understood more narrowly as linguistic information exchange and was one of the major motivations for the framework of dynamic semantics. In these expressions, denotations are equated with their ability to update a discourse context.

== Social theory ==
In the humanities and social sciences, discourse describes a formal way of thinking that can be expressed through language. Discourse is a social boundary that defines what statements can be said about a topic. Many definitions of discourse are primarily derived from the work of French philosopher Michel Foucault. In sociology, discourse is defined as "any practice (found in a wide range of forms) by which individuals imbue reality with meaning".

Political science sees discourse as closely linked to politics and policy making. Likewise, different theories among various disciplines understand discourse as linked to power and state, insofar as the control of discourses is understood as a hold on reality itself (for example, if a state controls the media, they control the "truth"). In essence, discourse is inescapable, since any use of language will have an effect on individual perspectives. In other words, the chosen discourse provides the vocabulary, expressions, or style needed to communicate. For example, two notably distinct discourses can be used about various guerrilla movements, describing them either as "freedom fighters" or "terrorists".

In psychology, discourses are embedded in different rhetorical genres and meta-genres that constrain and enable them—language talking about language. This is exemplified in the APA's Diagnostic and Statistical Manual of Mental Disorders, which tells of the terms that have to be used in speaking about mental health, thereby mediating meanings and dictating practices of professionals in psychology and psychiatry.

=== Modernism ===
Modernist theorists focused on achieving progress and believed in natural and social laws that could be used universally to develop knowledge and, thus, a better understanding of society. Such theorists would be preoccupied with obtaining the "truth" and "reality", seeking to develop theories which contained certainty and predictability. Modernist theorists therefore understood discourse to be functional. Discourse and language transformations are ascribed to progress or the need to develop new or more "accurate" words to describe discoveries, understandings, or areas of interest. In modernist theory, language and discourse are dissociated from power and ideology and instead conceptualized as "natural" products of common sense usage or progress. Modernism further gave rise to the liberal discourses of rights, equality, freedom, and justice; however, this rhetoric masked substantive inequality and failed to account for differences, according to Regnier.

=== Structuralism (Saussure and Lacan) ===
Structuralist theorists, such as Ferdinand de Saussure and Jacques Lacan, argue that all human actions and social formations are related to language and can be understood as systems of related elements. This means that the "individual elements of a system only have significance when considered about the structure as a whole, and that structures are to be understood as self-contained, self-regulated, and self-transforming entities". In other words, it is the structure itself that determines the significance, meaning, and function of the individual elements of a system. Structuralism has contributed to our understanding of language and social systems. Saussure's theory of language highlights the decisive role of meaning and signification in structuring human life more generally.

=== Poststructuralism (Foucault) ===
Following the perceived limitations of the modern era, emerged postmodern theory. Postmodern theorists rejected modernist claims that there was one theoretical approach that explained all aspects of society. Rather, postmodernist theorists were interested in examining the variety of experiences of individuals and groups and emphasized differences over similarities and shared experiences.

In contrast to modernist theory, postmodern theory is pessimistic regarding universal truths and realities. Hence, it has attempted to be fluid, allowing for individual differences as it rejects the notion of social laws. Postmodern theorists shifted away from truth-seeking and sought answers to how truths are produced and sustained. Postmodernists contended that truth and knowledge are plural, contextual, and historically produced through discourses. Postmodern researchers, therefore, embarked on analyzing discourses such as texts, language, policies, and practices.

=== Foucault ===
In the works of the philosopher Michel Foucault, a discourse is "an entity of sequences, of signs, in that they are enouncements (énoncés)." The enouncement (l’énoncé, "the statement") is a linguistic construct that allows the writer and the speaker to assign meaning to words and to communicate repeatable semantic relations to, between, and among the statements, objects, or subjects of the discourse. Internal ties exist between the signs (semiotic sequences). The term discursive formation identifies and describes written and spoken statements with semantic relations that produce discourses. As a researcher, Foucault applied the discursive formation to analyses of large bodies of knowledge, e.g. political economy and natural history.

In The Archaeology of Knowledge (1969), a treatise about the methodology and historiography of systems of thought ("epistemes") and knowledge ("discursive formations"), Michel Foucault developed the concepts of discourse. The sociologist Iara Lessa summarizes Foucault's definition of discourse as "systems of thoughts composed of ideas, attitudes, courses of action, beliefs, and practices that systematically construct the subjects and the worlds of which they speak." Foucault traces the role of discourse in the legitimation of society's power to construct contemporary truths, to maintain said truths, and to determine what relations of power exist among the constructed truths; therefore discourse is a communications medium through which power relations produce men and women who can speak.

The interrelation between power and knowledge renders every human relationship into a power negotiation, because power is always present and so produces and constrains the truth. Power is exercised through rules of exclusion (discourses) that determine what subjects people can discuss; when, where, and how a person may speak; and determines which persons are allowed to speak. That knowledge is both the creator of power and the creation of power; Foucault coined "power/knowledge" to show that it is "an abstract force which determines what will be known, rather than assuming that individual thinkers develop ideas and knowledge."

Interdiscourse studies the external semantic relations among discourses, as discourses exist in relation to other discourses.

== Discourse analysis ==
There is more than one type of discourse analysis, and the definition of "discourse" shifts slightly between types. Generally speaking, discourse analyses can be divided into those concerned with "little d" discourse and "big D" Discourse. The former ("little d") refers to language-in-use, such as spoken communication; the latter ("big D") refers to sociopolitical discourses (language plus social and cultural contexts).

Common forms of discourse analysis include:

- Critical discourse analysis
- Foucauldian discourse analysis
- Conversation analysis
- Genre analysis
- Narrative analysis

== Formal semantics and pragmatics ==
In formal semantics and pragmatics, discourse is often viewed as the process of refining the information in a common ground. In some theories of semantics, such as discourse representation theory, sentences' denotations themselves are equated with functions that update a common ground.

== See also ==
- power/knowledge
- Common ground
- Conversational scoreboard
- Deconstruction
- Difference (philosophy)
- Discipline and Punish
- Discourse community
- Discursive dominance
- Discourse Studies
- Dispositif
- Dynamic semantics
- Episteme
- Parrhesia
- Post-structuralism
- Pragmatics
- The Philosophical Discourse of Modernity, a 1985 book by Jürgen Habermas, regarded as an important contribution to Frankfurt School critical theory
- Public speaking
- Rhetoric
