= Modal verb =

Type of verb, such as "might", that is used to indicate modality

A modal verb is a type of verb that contextually indicates a modality such as a likelihood, ability, permission, request, capacity, suggestion, order, obligation, necessity, possibility or advice. Modal verbs generally accompany the base (infinitive) form of another verb having semantic content. In English, the modal verbs commonly used are can, could, may, might, must, shall, should, will, would, and ought to.

== Function ==
Modal verbs have a wide variety of communicative functions, but these functions can generally be related to a scale ranging from possibility ("may") to necessity ("must"), in terms of one of the following types of modality:

- epistemic modality, concerned with the theoretical possibility of propositions being true or not true (including likelihood and certainty)
- deontic modality, concerned with possibility and necessity in terms of freedom to act (including permission and duty)
- dynamic modality, which may be distinguished from deontic modality in that, with dynamic modality, the conditioning factors are internal – the subject's own ability or willingness to act

The following sentences illustrate epistemic and deontic uses of the English modal verb must:

- epistemic: You must be starving. ("I think it is almost a certainty that you are starving.")
- deontic: You must leave now. ("You are required to leave now.")

An ambiguous case is You must speak Spanish. The primary meaning would be the deontic meaning ("You are required to speak Spanish.") but this may be intended epistemically ("It is surely the case that you speak Spanish"). Epistemic modals can be analyzed as raising verbs, while deontic modals can be analyzed as control verbs.

Epistemic usages of modals tend to develop from deontic usages. For example, the inferred certainty sense of English must developed after the strong obligation sense; the probabilistic sense of should developed after the weak obligation sense; and the possibility senses of may and can developed later than the permission or ability sense. Two typical sequences of evolution of modal meanings are:

- internal mental ability → internal ability → root possibility (internal or external ability) → permission and epistemic possibility
- obligation → probability

== English ==
The following table lists English modal verbs and various senses in which they are used:

Modal verb	Epistemic sense	Deontic sense	Dynamic sense
can	That can indeed hinder.	You can, if you are allowed.	She can really sing.
could	That could happen soon.	–	He could swim when he was young.
do	That does happen a lot.	Do not run!	She really does sing.
may	That may be a problem.	May I stay?	–
might	The weather might improve.	Might I help you?	–
must	It must be hot outside.	Sam must go to school.	–
ought to	That ought to be correct.	You ought to be kind.	-
shall	(Note: Shall has a first person future meaning. Shall and will do not express probability and are instead used as markers for the future tense)-	You shall not pass.	–
should	That should be surprising.	You should stop that.	–
will	(Note: Will has a second and third person future meaning. Shall and will do not express probability and are instead used as markers for the future tense)-	I will be there!	–
would	Nothing would accomplish that.	–	–

== In other languages ==
=== Hawaiian Pidgin ===
Hawaiian Pidgin is a creole language most of whose vocabulary, but not grammar, is drawn from English. As is generally the case with creole languages, it is an isolating language and modality is typically indicated by the use of invariant pre-verbal auxiliaries. The invariance of the modal auxiliaries to person, number, and tense makes them analogous to modal auxiliaries in English. However, as in most creoles the main verbs are also invariant; the auxiliaries are distinguished by their use in combination with (followed by) a main verb.

There are various preverbal modal auxiliaries: Kaen "can", laik "want to", gata "have got to", haeftu "have to", baeta "had better", sapostu "am/is/are supposed to". Unlike in Germanic languages, tense markers are used, albeit infrequently, before modals: Gon kaen kam "is going to be able to come". Waz "was" can indicate past tense before the future/volitional marker gon and the modal sapostu: Ai waz gon lift weits "I was gonna lift weights"; Ai waz sapostu go "I was supposed to go".

=== Hawaiian ===
Hawaiian, like the Polynesian languages generally, is an isolating language, so its verbal grammar relies exclusively on unconjugated verbs. Thus, as with creoles, there is no real distinction between modal auxiliaries and lexically modal main verbs that are followed by another main verb. Hawaiian has an imperative indicated by e + verb (or in the negative by mai + verb). Some examples of the treatment of modality are as follows: Pono conveys obligation/necessity as in He pono i nā kamali'i a pau e maka'ala, "It's right for children all to beware", "All children should/must beware"; ability is conveyed by hiki as in Ua hiki i keia kamali'i ke heluhelu "Has enabled to this child to read", "This child can read".

=== French ===
French, like some other Romance languages, does not have a grammatically distinct class of modal auxiliary verbs and expresses modality using lexical verbs followed by infinitives: for example, pouvoir "to be able" (Je peux aller, "I can go"), devoir "to have an obligation" (Je dois aller, "I must go"), and vouloir "to want" (Je veux aller "I want to go").

=== Italian ===
Modal verbs in Italian form a distinct class (verbi modali or verbi servili). They can be easily recognized by the fact that they are the only group of verbs that does not have a fixed auxiliary verb for forming the perfect, but they can inherit it from the verb they accompany – Italian can have two different auxiliary verbs for forming the perfect, avere ("to have"), and essere ("to be"). There are in total four modal verbs in Italian: potere ("can"), volere ("want"), dovere ("must"), sapere ("to be able to"). Modal verbs in Italian are the only group of verbs allowed to follow this particular behavior. When they do not accompany other verbs, they all use avere ("to have") as a helping verb for forming the perfect.

For example, the helping verb for the perfect of potere ("can") is avere ("have"), as in ho potuto (lit. "I-have been-able","I could"); nevertheless, when used together with a verb that has as auxiliary essere ("be"), potere inherits the auxiliary of the second verb. For example: ho visitato il castello (lit. "I-have visited the castle") / ho potuto visitare il castello (lit. "I-have been-able to-visit the castle","I could visit the castle"); but sono scappato (lit. "I-am escaped", "I have escaped") / sono potuto scappare (lit. "I-am been-able to-escape", "I could escape").

Note that, like in other Romance languages, there is no distinction between an infinitive and a bare infinitive in Italian, hence modal verbs are not the only group of verbs that accompanies an infinitive (where in English instead there would be the form with "to" – see for example Ho preferito scappare ("I have preferred to escape"). Thus, while in English a modal verb can be easily recognized by the sole presence of a bare infinitive, there is no easy way to distinguish the four traditional Italian modal verbs from other verbs, except the fact that the former are the only verbs that do not have a fixed auxiliary verb for the perfect. For this reason some grammars consider also the verbs osare ("to dare to"), preferire ("to prefer to"), desiderare ("to desire to"), solere ("to use to") as modal verbs, despite these always use avere as auxiliary verb for the perfect.

=== Mandarin Chinese ===
Mandarin Chinese is an isolating language without inflections. As in English, modality can be indicated either lexically, with main verbs such as yào "want" followed by another main verb, or with auxiliary verbs. In Mandarin the auxiliary verbs have six properties that distinguish them from main verbs:

- They must co-occur with a verb (or an understood verb).
- They cannot be accompanied by aspect markers.
- They cannot be modified by intensifiers such as "very".
- They cannot be nominalized (used in phrases meaning, for example, "one who can")
- They cannot occur before the subject.
- They cannot take a direct object.

The complete list of modal auxiliary verbs consists of

- three meaning "should",
- four meaning "be able to",
- two meaning "have permission to",
- one meaning "dare",
- one meaning "be willing to",
- four meaning "must" or "ought to", and
- one meaning "will" or "know how to".

=== Spanish ===
Spanish, like French, uses fully conjugated verbs followed by infinitives. For example, poder "to be able" (Puedo andar, "I can walk"), deber "to have an obligation" (Debo andar, "I must walk"), and querer "to want" (Quiero andar "I want to walk").

The correct use of andar in these examples would be reflexive. "Puedo andar" means "I can walk", "Puedo irme" means "I can leave" or "I can take myself off/away". The same applies to the other examples.

== See also ==
- English auxiliaries and contractions
- German modal particle
- Grammatical mood
- Modal logic
- Modal word

== Bibliography ==
- The Syntactic Evolution of Modal Verbs in the History of English
- Walter W. Skeat, The Concise Dictionary of English Etymology (1993), Wordsworth Editions Ltd.
