= Craige Roberts =

American linguist (born 1949)

- Born: 20 February 1949

Academic background
- Education: Indiana University (AB), University of Massachusetts Amherst (PhD)
- Doctoral advisor: Barbara Partee

Academic work
- Discipline: Linguist
- Sub-discipline: Semantics, Pragmatics
- Institutions: Ohio State University

Craige Roberts (born February 20, 1949) is an American linguist, known for her work on pragmatics and formal semantics.

== Education and career ==
Roberts earned her A.B. at Indiana University in 1979. She received her Ph.D. at the University of Massachusetts, Amherst in 1987, under the supervision of Barbara Partee. She is an emeritus Professor at the Department of Linguistics of Ohio State University.

Her work in the areas of pragmatics and formal semantics explores how meaning is conveyed through anaphora, definiteness, and specificity of referring expressions, the modeling of presupposition and implicature, and methods for capturing modality, mood, tense, and aspect of verbs in language.

== Awards and distinctions ==
In 2015, Roberts and co-investigators David Beaver, Mandy Simons, and Judith Tonhauser were awarded a National Science Foundation (NSF) Collaborative Grant for the project “What’s the question? A cross-linguistic investigation into compositional and pragmatic constraints on the question under discussion.” In 2010 Roberts and Judith Tonhauser received an NSF award to study the semantics and pragmatics of projective meaning across languages.

Roberts's 2013 paper, "Toward a taxonomy of projective content," coauthored with Judith Tonhauser, David Beaver, and Mandy Simons won the 2013 Best Paper in Language (journal) Award from the Linguistic Society of America.

Roberts was a Senior Fellow at the Institute for Advanced Study at Central European University in 2014–2015.

She has served on the editorial board of Semantics and Pragmatics, the Baltic International Yearbook of Cognition, Logic and Communication, and is an Associate Editor for Linguistics and Philosophy.

Roberts is a member of the Linguistic Society of America, serving as the co-chair for the Committee on the Status of Women in Linguistics (COSWL) from 1990 to 1993.

== Publications ==
- 2013. J Tonhauser, D Beaver, C Roberts, M Simons. Toward a taxonomy of projective content, Language 89 (1), 66–109
- 2012. C Roberts. Information structure: afterword, Semantics and Pragmatics 5, 7–1–19
- 2012. C Roberts. Topics. Semantics: An International Handbook of Linguistics and Communication
- 2012. C Roberts. Only: A case study in projective meaning. The Baltic International Yearbook of Cognition, Logic and Communication
- 2010. M Simons, J Tonhauser, D Beaver, C Roberts. What projects and why, Semantics and linguistic theory 20, 309–327
- 2009. C Roberts, M Simons, D Beaver, J Tonhauser. Presupposition, conventional implicature, and beyond: A unified account of projection. Proceedings of the ESSLLI 2009.
