= Complex question =

Question that has a built-in supposition

A complex question, trick question, multiple question, fallacy of presupposition, or plurium interrogationum (Latin, 'of many questions') is a question that has a complex presupposition. The presupposition is a proposition that is presumed to be acceptable to the respondent when the question is asked. The respondent becomes committed to this proposition when they give any direct answer. When a presupposition includes an admission of wrongdoing, it is called a "loaded question" and is a form of entrapment in legal trials or debates. The presupposition is called "complex" if it is a conjunctive proposition, a disjunctive proposition, or a conditional proposition. It could also be another type of proposition that contains some logical connective in a way that makes it have several parts that are component propositions.

Complex questions can but do not have to be fallacious, as in being an informal fallacy.

== Complex question fallacy ==
The complex question fallacy, or many questions fallacy, is context dependent; a presupposition by itself does not have to be a fallacy. It is committed when someone asks a question that presupposes something that has not been proven or accepted by all the people involved. For example, "Is Mary wearing a blue or a red dress?" might be fallacious because it artificially restricts the possible responses to a blue or red dress, when in fact Mary might be wearing a different coloured dress, or trousers, or a skirt. If the person being questioned would not necessarily consent to those constraints, the question is fallacious.

Hence we can distinguish between:

- legitimately complex question (not a fallacy): a question that assumes something that the hearer would readily agree to. For example, "Who is the monarch of the United Kingdom?" assumes that there is a place called the United Kingdom and that it has a monarch, both true.
- illegitimately complex question: "Who is the King of France?" would commit the complex question fallacy because while it assumes there is a place called France (true), it also assumes France currently has a king (false). But since answering this question does not seem to incriminate or otherwise embarrass the speaker, it is complex but not really a loaded question.

When a complex question contains controversial presuppositions (often with loaded language—having an unspoken and often emotive implication), it is known as a loaded question. For example, a classic loaded question, containing incriminating assumptions that the questioned persons seem to admit to if they answer the questions instead of challenging them, is "Have you stopped beating your wife?" Whether the person questioned answers "yes" or "no", they imply that they have previously beaten their wife. A loaded question may be asked to trick the respondent into admitting something that the questioner believes to be true, and which may in fact be true. So the previous question is "loaded", whether or not the respondent has actually beaten their wife–and if the respondent answers anything other than "yes" or "no" in an attempt to deny having beaten their wife, the questioner can accuse them of "trying to dodge the question". The very same question may be loaded in one context, but not in the other. For example, the previous question would not be loaded were it asked during a trial in which the defendant has already admitted having beaten one's wife.

=== Similar questions and fallacies ===
A similar fallacy is the double-barreled question. It is committed when someone asks a question that touches upon more than one issue, yet allows only for one answer.

This fallacy can be also confused with petitio principii (begging the question), which offers a premise no more plausible than, and often just a restatement of, the conclusion.

Closely connected with [petitio principii] is the fallacy of the Complex Question. By a complex question, in the broadest meaning of that term, is meant one that suggests its own answer. Any question, for instance, that forces us to select, and assert in our answer to it, one of the elements of the question itself, while some other possibility is really open, is complex in the sense in which that term is here employed. If, for example, one were to ask whether you were going to New York or London, or if your favourite colour were red or blue, or if you had given up a particular bad habit, he would be guilty of the fallacy of the complex question, if, in each case, the alternatives, as a matter of fact, were more numerous than, or were in any way different from, those stated in the question. Any leading question which complicates an issue by over simplification is fallacious for the same reason… In the petitio principii an assumption with respect to the subject-matter of an argument functions as a premise, in the complex question it is a similar assumption that shuts out some of the material possibilities of a situation and confines an issue within too narrow limits. As in the former case, so here, the only way of meeting the difficulty is to raise the previous question, that is, to call the assumption which lies back of the fallacy into question.

— Arthur Ernest Davies, "Fallacies" in A Text-Book of Logic

== See also ==
- Wicked problem
