= Donkey sentence =

Sentence that resists simple formalization

In semantics, a donkey sentence is a sentence containing a pronoun which is semantically bound but syntactically free. The name comes from the example sentence "Every farmer who owns a donkey beats it", in which it acts as a donkey pronoun because it is semantically but not syntactically bound by the indefinite noun phrase a donkey. The phenomenon is known as donkey anaphora. (Note: Emar Maier describes donkey pronouns as "bound but not c-commanded" in a Linguist List review of Paul D. Elbourne's Situations and Individuals (MIT Press, 2006).Barker and Shan define a donkey pronoun as "a pronoun that lies outside the restrictor of a quantifier or the if-clause of a conditional, yet covaries with some quantificational element inside it, usually an indefinite.")

Donkey sentences are a classic puzzle in formal semantics and philosophy of language because they are fully grammatical and yet defy straightforward attempts to generate their formal language equivalents. In order to explain how speakers are able to understand them, semanticists have proposed a variety of formalisms including systems of dynamic semantics such as Discourse representation theory.

== Examples ==
The following sentences are examples of donkey sentences.

- Omne homo habens asinum videt illum. ("Every man who owns a donkey sees it.") — Walter Burley (1328), De puritate artis logicae tractatus longior
- Every farmer who owns a donkey beats it.
- If a farmer owns a donkey, he beats it.
- Every police officer who arrested a murderer insulted him.

== Analysis of donkey sentences ==
The goal of formal semantics is to show how sentences of a natural language such as English could be translated into a formal logical language, and so would then be amenable to mathematical analysis. Following Russell, it is typical to translate indefinite noun phrases using an existential quantifier, as in the following simple example from Burchardt et al:

"A woman smokes." is translated as $\exists x \,( \text{WOMAN}(x) \land \text{SMOKES}(x))$

The prototypical donkey sentence, "Every farmer who owns a donkey beats it.", requires careful consideration for adequate description (though reading "each" in place of "every" does simplify the formal analysis). The donkey pronoun in this case is the word it. Correctly translating this sentence will require using a universal quantifier for the indefinite noun phrase "a donkey", rather than the expected existential quantifier.

The naive first attempt at translation given below is not a well-formed sentence, since the variable $y$ is left free in the predicate $\text{BEAT}(x,y)$.

$$\forall x\, (\text{FARMER} (x) \land \exists y \,( \text{DONKEY}(y) \land \text{OWNS}(x,y)) \rightarrow \text{BEAT}(x,y))$$

It may be attempted to extend the scope of the existential quantifier to bind the free instance of $y$, but it still does not give a correct translation.

$$\forall x \,\exists y\, (\text{FARMER} (x) \land \text{DONKEY}(y) \land \text{OWNS}(x,y) \rightarrow \text{BEAT}(x,y))$$

This translation is incorrect since it is already true if there exists any object that is not a donkey: Given any object to be substituted for $x$, substituting any non-donkey object for $y$ makes the material conditional true (since its antecedent is false), and so existential clause is true for every choice of $x$.

A correct translation into first-order logic for the donkey sentence seems to be

$$\forall x\, \forall y\, ((\text{FARMER} (x) \land \text{DONKEY}(y) \land \text{OWNS}(x,y)) \rightarrow \text{BEAT}(x,y))$$,

indicating that indefinites must sometimes be interpreted as existential quantifiers, and other times as universal quantifiers.

There is nothing wrong with donkey sentences: they are grammatically correct, they are well-formed and meaningful, and their syntax is regular. However, it is difficult to explain how donkey sentences produce their semantic results, and how those results generalize consistently with all other language use. If such an analysis were successful, it might allow a computer program to accurately translate natural language forms into logical form. It is unknown how natural language users agree – apparently effortlessly – on the meaning of sentences such as the examples.

There may be several equivalent ways of describing this process. In fact, Hans Kamp (1981) and Irene Heim (1982) independently proposed very similar accounts in different terminology, which they called discourse representation theory (DRT) and file change semantics (FCS), respectively.

== Theories of donkey anaphora ==
It is usual to distinguish two main kinds of theories about the semantics of donkey pronouns. The most classical proposals fall within the so-called description-theoretic approach, a label that is meant to encompass all the theories that treat the semantics of these pronouns as akin to, or derivative from, the semantics of definite descriptions. The second main family of proposals goes by the name dynamic theories, and they model donkey anaphora – and anaphora in general – on the assumption that the meaning of a sentence lies in its potential to change the context (understood as the information shared by the participants in a conversation).

=== Description-theoretic approaches ===
Description-theoretic approaches are theories of donkey pronouns in which definite descriptions play an important role. They were pioneered by Gareth Evans's E-type approach, which holds that donkey pronouns can be understood as referring terms whose reference is fixed by description.

For example, in "Every farmer who owns a donkey beats it.", the donkey pronoun "it" can be expanded as a definite description to yield "Every farmer who owns a donkey beats the donkey he/she owns." This expanded sentence can be interpreted along the lines of Russell's theory of descriptions.

Later authors have attributed an even larger role to definite descriptions, to the point of arguing that donkey pronouns have the semantics, and even the syntax, of definite descriptions. Approaches of the latter kind are usually called D-type.

=== Discourse representation theory ===
Donkey sentences became a major force in advancing semantic research in the 1980s, with the introduction of discourse representation theory (DRT). During that time, an effort was made to settle the inconsistencies which arose from the attempts to translate donkey sentences into first-order logic.

The solution that DRT provides for the donkey sentence problem can be roughly outlined as follows: The common semantic function of non-anaphoric noun phrases is the introduction of a new discourse referent, which is in turn available for the binding of anaphoric expressions. No quantifiers are introduced into the representation, thus overcoming the scope problem that the logical translations had.

=== Dynamic Predicate Logic ===
Dynamic Predicate Logic models pronouns as first-order logic variables, but allows quantifiers in a formula to bind variables in other formulae.

== History ==
Walter Burley, a medieval scholastic philosopher, introduced donkey sentences in the context of supposition theory, the medieval equivalent of reference theory.

Peter Geach reintroduced donkey sentences as a counterexample to Richard Montague's proposal for a generalized formal representation of quantification in natural language. His example was reused by David Lewis (1975), Gareth Evans (1977) and many others, and is still quoted in recent publications.

== See also ==
- Epsilon calculus – Extension of a formal language by the epsilon operator
- Garden-path sentence – Sentence that starts in a way that a reader's likely interpretation will be wrong
- Generic antecedent – Representatives of classes in a situation in which gender is typically unknown
- Lambda calculus – Mathematical-logic system
- Montague grammar – Approach to natural language semantics
- Singular they – Gender-neutral English pronoun
