= Common ground (linguistics) =

Set of propositions that interlocutors agree is true

In semantics, pragmatics, and philosophy of language, the common ground of a conversation is the set of propositions that the interlocutors have agreed to treat as true. For a proposition to be in the common ground, it must be common knowledge in the conversational context. The set of possible worlds compatible with the common ground is often called the context set.

The concept is fundamental to many theories of discourse. In such theories, the speech act of assertion is often analyzed as a proposal to add an additional proposition to the common ground. Similarly, presuppositions are taken to be licensed when they are already established in the common ground. While such approaches are typically construed as pragmatic, the framework of dynamic semantics treats the semantic denotations of sentences as functions which update the common ground. In many theories, the common ground is one of several elements of the conversational scoreboard.

== See also ==
- Illocution
- Possible world
- Presupposition
- Question under discussion
- Speech act
- Domain of discourse
