= Loaded question =

Question containing an unjustified assumption

A loaded question is a form of complex question that contains a controversial assumption (e.g., a presumption of guilt).

Such questions may be used as a rhetorical tool: the question attempts to limit direct replies to be those that serve the questioner's agenda. The traditional example is the question "Have you stopped beating your wife?" Without further clarification, an answer of either yes or no suggests the respondent has beaten their wife at some time in the past. Thus, these facts are presupposed by the question, and in this case an entrapment, because it narrows the respondent to a single answer, and the fallacy of many questions has been committed.

The fallacy relies upon context for its effect: the fact that a question presupposes something does not in itself make the question fallacious. Only when some of these presuppositions are not necessarily agreed to by the person who is asked the question does the argument containing them become fallacious. Hence, the same question may be loaded in one context, but not in the other. For example, the previous question would not be loaded if it were asked during a trial in which the defendant had already admitted to beating his wife.

This informal fallacy should be distinguished from that of begging the question, which offers a premise whose plausibility depends on the truth of the proposition asked about, and which is often an implicit restatement of the proposition.

== Defense ==
A common way out of this argument is not to answer the question (e.g. with a simple 'yes' or 'no'), but to challenge the assumption behind the question. To use an earlier example, a good response to the question "Have you stopped beating your wife?" would be "I have never beaten my wife". This removes the ambiguity of the expected response, therefore nullifying the tactic. However, the asker may respond to a challenge by accusing the one who answers of dodging the question.

== Historical examples ==
Diogenes Laërtius wrote a brief biography of the philosopher Menedemus in which he relates that:

[O]nce when Alexinus asked him whether he had left off beating his father, he said, "I have not beaten him, and I have not left off;" and when he said further that he ought to put an end to the doubt by answering explicitly yes or no, "It would be absurd," he rejoined, "to comply with your conditions, when I can stop you at the entrance."

For another example, the 2009 New Zealand child discipline referendum asked: "Should a smack as part of good parental correction be a criminal offence in New Zealand?" Murray Edridge, of Barnardos New Zealand, criticized the question as "loaded and ambiguous" and claimed "the question presupposes that smacking is a part of good parental correction".

== See also ==
- Barber paradox
- Complex question
- Entailment (pragmatics)
- False dilemma
- Gotcha journalism
- Implicature
- Leading question
- Presupposition
- Suggestive question
- List of fallacies
