= Modal adjective =

Type of adjective that is used to indicate modality, such as "likely"

Modal adjectives are adjectives, such as likely, probable and necessary, that express modality, i.e., possibility, necessity, or contingency.

== In English ==
Modal adjectives can express modality regarding a situation or a participant in that situation. With situations, some usual syntactic patterns include extraposed subject, such as the underlined elements in the following examples with the modal adjective in bold. Here the modal adjective is analyzed semantically as a sentential modal operator.

1. It's **possible** that some of them are broken.
2. It's **likely** that they will come.
3. It is **necessary** (for us) to make a choice.

For participants, however, the usual syntactic construction has the adjective phrase in attributive modifier function, as in the following examples, where the modal adjective is again in bold and this time the participant is underlined.

1. We've found a **potential** replacement.
2. They need to file the **necessary** papers.
3. We took the **obligatory** photo.

Other constructions are also possible. For example, contingency may be expressed as We've made an offer contingent on the sale of our house, which can be paraphrased as Our offer stands if and only if we sell our house.

== In Japanese ==
In Japanese, possibility is often expressed with the adjectives 可能 (kanō 'possible') and 不可能 (fukanō 'impossible'), as in:

目標 を 実現 する こと は 不可能 です
Mokuhyou o jitsugen suru koto wa fukanou desu
'It's impossible to realize that goal'

Impossibility can also be expressed with the modal adjective 無理 (muri 'impossible') as in:

円 を 7 で 等分 する こと は 無理 です
en o nana de toubun suru koto wa muri desu
'a circle cannot be divided into seven equal parts'

The modern Japanese particle べき (beki 'should') derives from the traditional modal adjective べし (beshi) but no longer inflects.

== See also ==
- Modal word
