= Modality (semantics) =

Phenomenon whereby language is used to discuss possible situations

Modality is the expression in language of how real, possible or necessary something said is.

Languages commonly express modality using modal auxiliaries such as "could", "should", or "must"; modal adverbs such as "possibly" or "necessarily"; and modal adjectives such as "conceivable" or "probable". Modal components have also been identified in the meanings of other natural language expressions, including counterfactuals, propositional attitudes, evidentials, habituals, and generics.

Modality has been studied from a variety of perspectives in linguistics. Typological linguists have traced variation in the ways different languages mark modality, with a particular focus on its interaction with tense–aspect–mood marking. Theoretical linguists have sought to analyze both the propositional content and discourse effects of modal expressions using formal tools derived from modal logic.

Within philosophy, linguistic modality is often studied alongside broader metaphysical notions of necessity and possibility.

== Types of modality ==
=== Epistemic and deontic modality ===
Modal expressions come in different categories called flavors. Flavors differ in how the possibilities they discuss relate to reality. For instance, an expression like "might" is said to have epistemic flavor, since it discusses possibilities compatible with some body of knowledge. An expression like "obligatory" is said to have deontic flavor, since it discusses possibilities which are required given the laws or norms obeyed in reality.

1. Agatha must be the murderer. (expressing epistemic modality)
2. Agatha must go to jail. (expressing deontic modality)

The first sentence might be spoken by someone who has decided that all of the relevant facts in a particular murder investigation point to the conclusion that Agatha was the murderer, even though it may or may not actually be the case. The 'must' in this sentence thus expresses epistemic modality: "'for all we know', Agatha must be the murderer", where 'for all we know' is relative to some knowledge the speakers possess.

In contrast, the second sentence might be spoken by someone who has decided that, according to some standard of conduct, Agatha has committed a vile crime or otherwise it would be sufficiently problematic for Agatha to be not imprisoned, and therefore the correct course of action is to jail Agatha.

=== Modal base and force ===
In classic formal approaches to linguistic modality, an utterance expressing modality is one that can always roughly be paraphrased to fit the following template:

According to [a set of rules, wishes, beliefs,...] it is [necessary, possible] that [the main proposition] is the case.

The set of propositions which forms the basis of evaluation is called the modal base. The result of the evaluation is called the modal force. For example, the phrase 'John must be earning a lot of money' expresses that, according to what the speaker has observed, it is necessary to conclude that John has a rather high income. The modal base here is the knowledge of the speaker, the modal force is necessity.

By contrast, the phrase 'John can open a beer bottle with his teeth' could be paraphrased as 'Given his abilities (the strength of his teeth, etc.), it is possible for John to open a beer bottle with his teeth'. Here, the modal base is defined by a subset of John's abilities, the modal force is possibility.

== Academic study ==
Linguistic modality has been one of the central concerns in formal semantics and philosophical logic. Research in these fields has led to a variety of accounts of the propositional content and conventional discourse effects of modal expressions. The predominant approaches in these fields are based on modal logic. In these approaches, modal expressions such as must and can are analyzed as quantifiers over a set of possible worlds. In classical modal logic, this set is identified as the set of worlds accessible from the world of evaluation. Since the seminal work of Angelika Kratzer, formal semanticists have adopted a more finely grained notion of this set as determined by two conversational background functions called the modal base and ordering source respectively.

For an epistemic modal like English must or might, this set is understood to contain exactly those worlds compatible with the knowledge that the speaker has in the actual world. Assume for example that the speaker of sentence (4) above knows that John just bought a new luxury car and has rented a huge apartment. The speaker also knows that John is an honest person with a humble family background and doesn't play the lottery. The set of accessible worlds is then the set of worlds in which all these propositions which the speaker knows about John are true. The notions of necessity and possibility are then defined along the following lines: A proposition P follows necessarily from the set of accessible worlds, if all accessible worlds are part of P (that is, if p is true in all of these worlds). Applied to the example in (4) this would mean that in all the worlds which are defined by the speaker's knowledge about John, it is the case that John earns a lot of money (assuming there is no other explanation for John's wealth). In a similar way a proposition p is possible according to the set of accessible worlds (i.e. the modal base), if some of these worlds are part of P.

Recent work has departed from this picture in a variety of ways. In dynamic semantics, modals are analyzed as tests which check whether their prejacent is compatible with (or follows from) the information in the conversational common ground. Probabilistic approaches motivated by gradable modal expressions provide a semantics which appeals to speaker credence in the prejacent. Illocutionary approaches assume a sparser view of modals' propositional content and look to conventional discourse effects to explain some of the nuances of modals' use.

== Grammatical expression of modality ==
=== Verbal morphology ===
In many languages, modal categories are expressed by verbal morphology (by changing the form of the verb). If these verbal markers of modality are obligatory in a language, they are called mood markers.

Well-known examples of moods in some European languages are the subjunctive, conditional, and indicative. These three moods are illustrated below with examples using the French verb avoir ('to have'). As in most Standard European languages, the shape of the verb conveys not only information about modality, but also about other categories such as person and number of the subject.

Je doute que vous ayez raison.
1SG doubt that 2PL have.2PL.SJV right
'I doubt that you're right.'

Si c'était vrai, on l'aurait vu sur CNN
If this-was true we it-have.SG.COND seen on CNN‍
'If this were true, we would have seen it on CNN.'

Il a raison
3SG have.3SG.IND right
'He's right.'

An example for a non-European language with a similar encoding of modality is Manam. Here, a verb is prefixed by a morpheme which encodes number and person of the subject. These prefixes come in two versions, realis and irrealis. Which one is chosen depends on whether the verb refers to an actual past or present event (realis), or merely to a possible or imagined event (irrealis).

=== Auxiliaries ===
Modal auxiliary verbs, such as the English words may, can, must, ought, will, shall, need, dare, might, could, would, and should, are often used to express modality, especially in the Germanic languages.

Ability, desirability, permission, obligation, and probability can all be expressed using auxiliary modal verbs in English:

Ability: I can ride a bicycle (in the present); I could ride a bicycle (in the past)

Desirability: I should go; I ought to go

Permission: I may go

Obligation: I must go

Likelihood: He might be there; He may be there; He must be there

=== Lexical expression ===
Verbs such as "want," "need," or "belong" can be used to express modality lexically, as can adverbs.

(9) It belongs in a museum!

=== Other ===
Complementizers (e.g. Russian) and conjunctions (e.g. Central Pomo) can be used to convey modality.

== See also ==
- Angelika Kratzer
- Counterfactuals
- Dynamic semantics
- Evidentiality
- Frank R. Palmer
- Free choice inference
- Modal logic
- Modal subordination
- Modality (semiotics)
- Possible world
- Tense–aspect–mood
- English modal adverbs at Wiktionary
