= Interlocutor (linguistics) =

Person involved in a conversation or dialogue

In linguistics, discourse analysis, and related fields, an interlocutor is a person involved in a conversation or dialogue. Two or more people speaking to one another are each other's interlocutors. The terms conversation partner, hearer, or addressee are often used interchangeably with interlocutor.

== Linguistic alignment ==
Linguistic alignment is an observed behavior where interlocutors are more likely to use or understand language that they have just heard or said. This is a form of unconscious mimicry in order to facilitate communication. In task-oriented studies, participants were more likely to lexically align when the interlocutors' shared vocabulary most directly related to the task at hand.

In situations where a participant is primed by a recording, rather than a human interlocutor, they are less likely to exhibit linguistic alignment. This suggests that linguistic choices are influenced by the interlocutor's communicative intent.

Notably, linguistic alignment is believed to occur at multiple levels of conversation, including lexical, syntactic, semantic, and situational levels.

== Interlocutor interaction ==
According to Paul Grice, the behavior of interlocutors in ordinary conversation is governed by the cooperative principle.

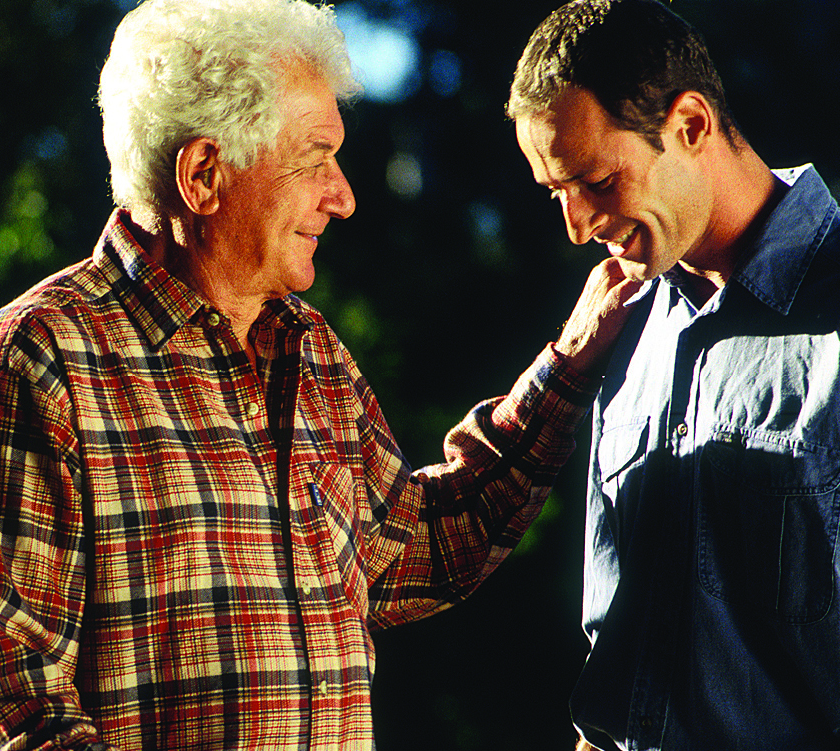
Two interlocutors engaging in a dyad conversation

Research has shown that interlocutors will match their language's complexity to their partner interlocutor's language ability. Furthermore, when one interlocutor is a native speaker and another is a learner of a particular language, interlocutors will modify their communication strategies.

Studies have also shown that language-related misunderstandings in a conversation between a native interlocutor and a learner interlocutor are more likely to be resolved than between two non-native interlocutors.

When using dialectally ambiguous words, participants will take into account the dialect their interlocutor is using in order to deduce the most likely meaning. For instance, if a British English interlocutor says "flat," the addressee will likely assume they mean "apartment."

== See also ==
- Addressee honorific
- Clusivity
- Common ground (linguistics)
- Conversation analysis
- Discourse
