= Conversational scoreboard =

Context representation used in formal pragmatics

In linguistics and philosophy of language, the conversational scoreboard (or conversational score) is a theoretical representation of the state of a conversation at a given moment. It treats discourse as a kind of game in which each speech act updates a structured collection of contextual parameters – for example the common ground, the questions currently under discussion and the interlocutors' public commitments – thereby constraining which subsequent moves are appropriate or felicitous.

The notion was introduced by David Lewis in his paper "Scorekeeping in a Language Game" (1979), which compares conversation to a game of baseball whose scoreboard records the evolving status of play. Since then, variants of the scoreboard framework have played an important role in dynamic semantics, formal pragmatics and recent work in social and political philosophy of language.

== History ==
=== Common ground and early context models ===
Lewis' scorekeeping model builds on earlier work by Robert Stalnaker on conversational context and common ground. Stalnaker characterises conversation as proceeding against an ever-changing background of propositions that interlocutors mutually accept, the common ground, whose intersection is a set of possible worlds compatible with what is taken for granted in the conversation. This common-ground view provided a template for treating context as an explicit object in semantic and pragmatic theorising.

During the 1970s and 1980s, dynamic approaches to meaning in natural language semantics – including context-change semantics and file-change semantics – developed the idea that the meaning of an expression should be understood in terms of its potential to update such contextual representations. These developments set the stage for treating context as an information state that can be formally modelled and manipulated.

=== Lewis's scorekeeping model ===
In "Scorekeeping in a Language Game", Lewis proposes that a conversation can be modelled by a conversational score, a tuple of abstract parameters that determine the truth, appropriateness or acceptability of utterances in that conversation. The score includes, among other things, sets of presupposed propositions, conversationally salient restrictions on quantifiers, standards of precision for vague predicates and other parameters relevant to evaluating speech acts.

Lewis emphasises two ideas. First, which utterances count as correct or acceptable depends on the current score, just as the legality of a move in baseball depends on the current count of balls, strikes and outs. Second, the score itself is affected by what speakers say, often via accommodation: the score may adjust so that an apparently acceptable utterance comes out true or felicitous, provided no interlocutor objects. This helps explain how presuppositions, contextual standards and other parameters can shift in the course of conversation.

Lewis' paper became a central reference point for later work on presupposition, indexicality, vagueness, modality and other context-sensitive phenomena in both philosophy and linguistics.

=== Subsequent developments ===
Later authors extended and modified Lewis' framework in several directions. Stalnaker refined his account of common ground and its interaction with assertion, arguing that making an assertion is characteristically a proposal to add its content to the common ground, subject to uptake by other interlocutors.

Dynamic semantics and dynamic pragmatics generalised the idea of a conversational score as an evolving information state. Work by Jonathan Ginzburg on dialogue gameboards, for instance, models the context of a conversation using a structured record containing shared information, outstanding questions and other discourse-relevant parameters.

In formal pragmatics, Donka Farkas and Kim Bruce developed a context structure for modelling speech acts as updates to a score containing a common ground, individual discourse commitments, and a "Table" of issues currently under negotiation. In epistemology, Keith DeRose drew on Lewis to formulate "single scoreboard semantics" for epistemic contextualism, treating the truth conditions of knowledge ascriptions as determined by a single conversational score for a given exchange.

Recent surveys, such as the overview by Lars Dänzer, Stefan Rinner and Eugenia Kulakova, present "conversational scorekeeping" as a broad research programme encompassing these and other developments in semantics, pragmatics and philosophy of language.

== Structure of the conversational scoreboard ==
There is no universally accepted list of components that every conversational scoreboard must contain, and different authors choose different parameters depending on their theoretical goals. However, many frameworks explicitly or implicitly treat the score as a tuple of abstract objects representing at least the following types of information:

- Common ground and context set. A set of propositions that participants treat as mutually accepted, often represented by the set of possible worlds in which all of those propositions are true.
- Questions under discussion or issues on the Table. Many models posit an ordered set or stack of matters currently being negotiated, sometimes called the "Table" or the set of questions under discussion (QUD). This component structures conversational relevance and helps explain the role of focus and information structure.
- Discourse commitments. Some theories track, for each participant, the propositions that they have publicly committed themselves to during the conversation, whether or not these are yet part of the common ground.
- Discourse referents and information state. In many dynamic semantic frameworks, the score includes a stock of discourse referents – abstract markers for individuals, times or events introduced in the conversation – which serve as potential antecedents for anaphoric expressions such as pronouns.
- Normative and contextual parameters. Following Lewis, many authors assume additional parameters representing, for example, standards of precision for vague predicates, contextually relevant alternatives, ordering sources for modals or contextually salient comparison classes.

These components are usually understood as abstract, set-theoretic objects, rather than as psychological states of particular speakers, though some authors have explored more cognitive or socially embedded interpretations of the score.

== Score update and accommodation ==
On scorekeeping accounts, the meaning of a sentence (or the content of a speech act) is typically characterised in terms of how it updates the scoreboard. Assertions, questions, imperatives and other speech acts have characteristic update rules specifying how the various components of the score change when such an act is successfully performed.

A central phenomenon for scorekeeping theories is accommodation. An utterance may presuppose that the score already contains certain information (for example, that there is a unique king of France). If the utterance appears acceptable and no interlocutor challenges the presupposition, the score is adjusted so that the required information is added to the common ground, making the utterance evaluable as true or false. Lewis and later authors have argued that similar accommodation mechanisms operate for other score components, such as standards of precision or contextually relevant alternatives, helping to explain how conversational moves can reshape the space of permissible future moves.

Scorekeeping formalisms also allow theorists to model more fine-grained conversational dynamics, such as the difference between merely proposing an update and its actual acceptance by other participants, or the ways in which rejections, corrections and denials can revert or block proposed changes to the score.

== Applications ==
=== Formal semantics and pragmatics ===
Scorekeeping has been applied to a variety of phenomena in formal semantics and pragmatics. Farkas and Bruce use a score-based context structure to analyse similarities and differences between assertions and polar questions, and to model how answers and response particles update the common ground, the Table and individual discourse commitments.

Sophia Malamud and Tamina Stephenson employ a conversational scoreboard to analyse declarative force modifiers – expressions that affect a speaker's degree or type of commitment to the content of an utterance, such as epistemic adverbs and parenthetical clauses. In their account, such modifiers alter how an utterance interacts with the score, for example by preventing its content from being fully added to the common ground while still updating other components of the scoreboard.

Sunwoo Jeong uses a scoreboard-based framework to investigate intonation and sentence-type conventions, arguing that different kinds of rising declaratives correspond to distinct patterns of score update and commitments, distinct from both canonical assertions and questions. Other authors have extended scorekeeping approaches to discourse particles, evidentials and right-peripheral tags in a range of languages.

=== Computational and dialogical models ===
In computational linguistics and dialogue theory, scoreboard-like structures underlie many models of conversational agents and dialogue management. Jonathan Ginzburg's dialogue gameboard framework represents the state of a conversation using records that encode shared assumptions, current issues, pending moves and discourse referents, and specifies how these records are updated by various types of speech acts. Raquel Fernández and others have provided formal implementations of such "gameboards" using dynamic logic and related tools.

These approaches connect the philosophical idea of scorekeeping with practical concerns in computational linguistics, such as reference resolution, clarification requests and the management of multi-party dialogue.

=== Epistemology and context sensitivity ===
In epistemology, Lewis's scorekeeping metaphor has influenced contextualist accounts of knowledge ascriptions. Keith DeRose's "single scoreboard semantics" develops a model in which claims of the form "S knows that p" are evaluated relative to a single conversational scoreboard, whose epistemic standards can shift in response to conversational moves such as sceptical challenges or raising of possibilities. On this view, the truth of knowledge ascriptions depends on context-sensitive parameters tracked by the score, in a way analogous to Lewis' treatment of standards of precision.

Other authors have used scorekeeping ideas to analyse disagreement, the raising and lowering of epistemic standards, and the interaction between individual and shared epistemic commitments.

=== Social and political philosophy of language ===
Scorekeeping has also been applied to questions in social and political philosophy of language. Rae Langton and Caroline West use Lewis's model to argue that pornography can function as a form of speech that systematically changes the conversational score, shaping presuppositions and norms in ways that contribute to subordination and silencing. Later work on hate speech, propaganda and oppressive discourse has similarly appealed to scorekeeping to explain how certain forms of speech can alter social norms and permissions by shifting what is taken for granted in a community.

Stefan Rinner has extended the scorekeeping framework to psychotherapeutic contexts, arguing that the effectiveness of some talking therapies can be understood in terms of how therapeutic interventions change the conversational score between therapist and client, including both common ground and patterns of accommodation.

== Debates and criticisms ==
Because a conversational scoreboard is an abstract representation, there is ongoing debate about how literally it should be taken. Some authors treat the score as a useful idealisation that captures normative constraints on correct conversational moves, rather than as a direct model of speakers' mental states. Others explore more cognitive or social-psychological interpretations, linking the score to patterns of belief, expectation and authority in actual communities.

There is also disagreement about which parameters genuinely belong on the scoreboard. For example, some philosophers question whether standards of precision or certain modal parameters should be represented as separate score components, or whether the same phenomena can be handled by alternative semantic mechanisms. Debates about "single" versus "multiple" scoreboards concern whether a conversation should be modelled as having one shared score or different scores for different participants, especially in cases of persistent disagreement.

Recent surveys emphasise that "conversational scorekeeping" is better seen as a family of related approaches, rather than a single, unified theory: the idea of a conversational scoreboard can be implemented in more or less Stalnakerian, Lewisian, dynamic-semantic or game-theoretic ways, with different consequences for how we understand context, meaning and conversation.

== See also ==
- Common ground (linguistics)
- Discourse
- Dynamic semantics
- Question under discussion
- Speech act
