= Hans Kamp =

Dutch philosopher and linguist

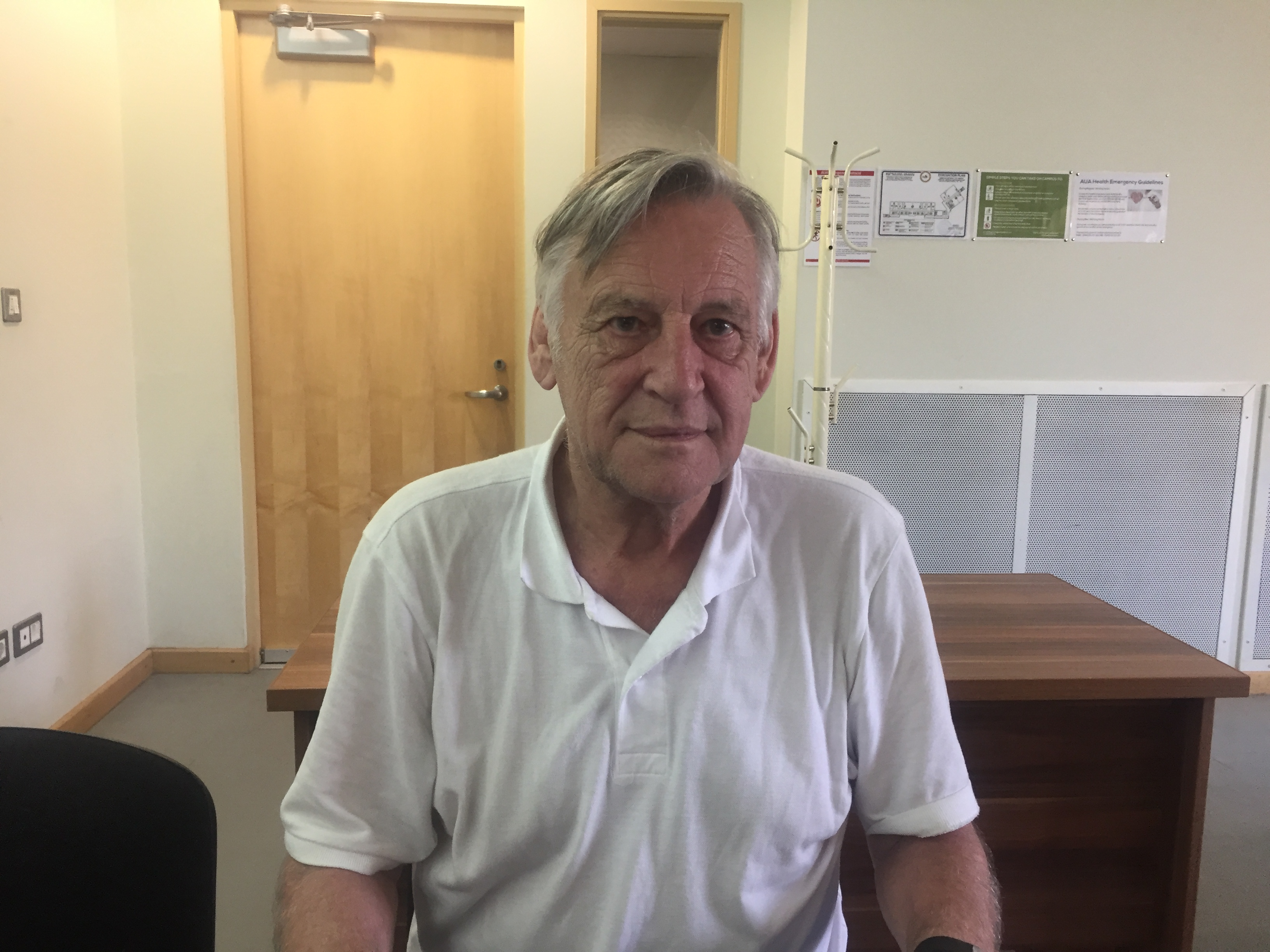
- Born: 5 September 1940 (age 85); Den Burg, Texel, North Holland

Philosophical work
- Era: Contemporary philosophy
- Region: Western philosophy
- School: Analytic philosophy
- Main interests: Philosophy of language, semantics
- Notable ideas: Discourse representation theory

Johan Anthony Willem "Hans" Kamp (born 5 September 1940) is a Dutch philosopher and linguist, responsible for introducing discourse representation theory (DRT) in 1981.

== Biography ==
Kamp was born in Den Burg. He received a Ph.D. in Philosophy from UCLA in 1968, and has taught at Cornell University, University of London, University of Texas, Austin, and University of Stuttgart. His dissertation, Tense Logic and the Theory of Linear Order (1968) was devoted to functional completeness in tense logic, the main result being that all temporal operators are definable in terms of "since" and "until", provided that the underlying temporal structure is a continuous linear ordering. Kamp's 1971 paper on "now" (published in Theoria) was the first employment of double-indexing in model theoretic semantics. His doctoral committee included Richard Montague as chairman, Chen Chung Chang, David Kaplan, Yiannis N. Moschovakis, and Jordan Howard Sobel.

Kamp became a corresponding member of the Royal Netherlands Academy of Arts and Sciences in 1997. He was awarded the Jean Nicod Prize in 1996 and was elected a Fellow of the American Academy of Arts & Sciences in 2015. In 2024 he was awarded the Rolf Schock Prize jointly with Irene Heim.

== Publications ==
- Kamp, Hans. 'A Theory of Truth and Semantic Representation'. In J. Groenendijk and others (eds.). Formal Methods in the Study of Language. Amsterdam: Mathematics Center, 1981.
- Kamp, Hans and Uwe Reyle. `From Discourse to Logic: Introduction to Modeltheoretic Semantics of Natural Language, Formal Logic and Discourse Representation Theory'. Dordrecht: Kluwer Academic Publishers, 1994.

== See also ==
- Anaphora (linguistics)
- Donkey pronoun
- Donkey sentence
- Irene Heim
- Lambda calculus
- Montague grammar
- Quantification (linguistics)
- Two-dimensional semantics
