= Presupposition =

Assumed context surrounding an utterance

In linguistics and philosophy, a presupposition is an implicit assumption about the world or background belief relating to an utterance, whose truth is taken for granted in discourse. An example is the question Have you talked to Hans? which presupposes Hans exists.

A presupposition is information that is linguistically presented as being mutually known or assumed by the speaker and addressee. This may be required for the utterance to be considered appropriate in context, but it is not uncommon for new information to be encoded in presuppositions without disrupting the flow of conversation (see accommodation below). A presupposition remains mutually known by the speaker and addressee whether the utterance is placed in the form of an assertion, denial, or question, and can be associated with a specific lexical item or grammatical feature (presupposition trigger) in the utterance.

Crucially, negation of an expression does not change its presuppositions: I want to do it again and I don't want to do it again both presuppose that the subject has done it already one or more times; My wife is pregnant and My wife is not pregnant both presuppose that the subject has a wife. In this respect, presupposition is distinguished from entailment and implicature. For example, The president was assassinated entails that The president is dead, but if the expression is negated, the entailment is not necessarily true.

== Negation of a sentence containing a presupposition ==
If presuppositions of a sentence are not consistent with the actual state of affairs, then one of two approaches can be taken. Given the sentences My wife is pregnant and My wife is not pregnant when one has no wife, then either:

1. Both the sentence and its negation are false; or
2. Strawson's approach: Both "my wife is pregnant" and "my wife is not pregnant" use a wrong presupposition (i.e. that there exists a referent which can be described with the noun phrase my wife) and therefore can not be assigned truth values.

Bertrand Russell tries to solve this dilemma with two interpretations of the negated sentence:

1. "There exists exactly one person, who is my wife and who is not pregnant"
2. "There does not exist exactly one person, who is my wife and who is pregnant."

For the first phrase, Russell would claim that it is false, whereas the second would be true according to him.

== Projection of presuppositions ==
A presupposition of a part of an utterance is sometimes also a presupposition of the whole utterance, and sometimes not. For instance, the phrase my wife triggers the presupposition that I have a wife. The first sentence below carries that presupposition, even though the phrase occurs inside an embedded clause. In the second sentence, however, it does not. John might be mistaken about his belief that I have a wife, or he might be deliberately trying to misinform his audience, and this has an effect on the meaning of the second sentence, but, perhaps surprisingly, not on the first one.

1. John thinks that my wife is beautiful.
2. John said that my wife is beautiful.

Thus, this seems to be a property of the main verbs of the sentences, think and say, respectively. After work by Lauri Karttunen, verbs that allow presuppositions to "pass up" to the whole sentence ("project") are called holes, and verbs that block such passing up, or projection of presuppositions are called plugs. Some linguistic environments are intermediate between plugs and holes: They block some presuppositions and allow others to project. These are called filters. An example of such an environment are indicative conditionals ("If-then" clauses). A conditional sentence contains an antecedent and a consequent. The antecedent is the part preceded by the word "if," and the consequent is the part that is (or could be) preceded by "then." If the consequent contains a presupposition trigger, and the triggered presupposition is explicitly stated in the antecedent of the conditional, then the presupposition is blocked. Otherwise, it is allowed to project up to the entire conditional. Here is an example:

If I have a wife, then my wife is blonde.

Here, the presupposition (that I have a wife) triggered by the expression my wife is blonde, because it is stated in the antecedent of the conditional: That sentence doesn't imply that I have a wife. In the following example, it is not stated in the antecedent, so it is allowed to project, i.e. the sentence does imply that I have a wife.

If it's already 4am, then my wife is probably angry.

Hence, conditional sentences act as filters for presuppositions that are triggered by expressions in their consequent.

A significant amount of current work in semantics and pragmatics is devoted to a proper understanding of when and how presuppositions project.

== Presupposition triggers ==
A presupposition trigger is a lexical item or linguistic construction which is responsible for the presupposition, and thus "triggers" it. The following is a selection of presuppositional triggers following Stephen C. Levinson's classic textbook on Pragmatics, which in turn draws on a list produced by Lauri Karttunen. As is customary, the presuppositional triggers themselves are italicized, and the symbol » stands for 'presupposes'.

=== Definite descriptions ===
Definite descriptions are phrases of the form "the X" where X represents a noun phrase. The description is said to be proper when the phrase applies to exactly one object, and conversely, it is said to be improper when either there exist more than one potential referents, as in "the senator from Ohio", or none at all, as in "the king of France". In conventional speech, definite descriptions are implicitly assumed to be proper, hence such phrases trigger the presupposition that the referent is unique and existent.

- John saw the man with two heads.
  »there exists a man with two heads.

=== Factive verbs ===
In Western epistemology, there is a tradition originating with Plato of defining knowledge as justified true belief. On this definition, for someone to know X, it is required that X be true. A linguistic question thus arises regarding the usage of such phrases: does a person who states "John knows X" implicitly claim the truth of X? Steven Pinker explored this question in a popular science format in a 2007 book on language and cognition, using a widely publicized example from a speech by a U.S. president. A 2003 speech by George W. Bush included the line, "British Intelligence has learned that Saddam Hussein recently sought significant quantities of uranium from Africa." Over the next few years, it became apparent that this intelligence lead was incorrect. But the way the speech was phrased, using a factive verb, implicitly framed the lead as truth rather than hypothesis. There is however a strong alternative view that the factivity thesis, the proposition that relational predicates having to do with knowledge, such as knows, learn, remembers, and realized, presuppose the factual truth of their object, is incorrect.

- Martha regrets drinking John's home brew.
  - Presupposition: Martha did in fact drink John's home brew.
- Frankenstein was aware that Dracula was there.
  - Presupposition: Dracula was in fact there.
- John realized that he was in debt.
  - Presupposition: John was in fact in debt.
- It was odd how proud he was.
  - Presupposition: He was in fact proud.

Some further factive predicates: know; be sorry that; be proud that; be indifferent that; be glad that; be sad that.

=== Implicative verbs ===
- John managed to open the door.
  »John tried to open the door.
- John forgot to lock the door.
  »John ought to have locked, or intended to lock, the door.

Some further implicative predicates: X happened to V»X didn't plan or intend to V; X avoided Ving»X was expected to, or usually did, or ought to V, etc.

=== Change of state or continuation of state verbs ===
With these presupposition triggers, the current unfolding situation is considered presupposed information.

- John stopped teasing his wife.
  »John had been teasing his wife.
- Joan began teasing her husband.
  »Joan hadn't been teasing her husband.

Some further change of state verbs: start; finish; carry on; cease; take (as in X took Y from Z » Y was at/in/with Z); leave; enter; come; go; arrive; etc.

=== Iteratives ===
These types of triggers presuppose the existence of a previous state of affairs.

- The flying saucer came again.
  »The flying saucer came before.
- You can't get gobstoppers anymore.
  »You once could get gobstoppers.
- Carter returned to power.
  »Carter held power before.

Further iteratives: another time; to come back; restore; repeat; for the nth time.

=== Temporal clauses ===
The situation explained in a clause that begins with a temporal clause constructor is typically considered backgrounded information.

- Before Strawson was even born, Frege noticed presuppositions.
  »Strawson was born.
- While Chomsky was revolutionizing linguistics, the rest of social science was asleep.
  »Chomsky was revolutionizing linguistics.
- Since Churchill died, we've lacked a leader.
  »Churchill died.

Further temporal clause constructors: after; during; whenever; as (as in As John was getting up, he slipped).

=== Cleft sentences ===
Cleft sentence structures highlight particular aspects of a sentence and consider the surrounding information to be backgrounded knowledge. These sentences are typically not spoken to strangers, but rather to addressees who are aware of the ongoing situation.

- Cleft construction: It was Henry that kissed Rosie.
  »Someone kissed Rosie.
- Pseudo-cleft construction: What John lost was his wallet.
  »John lost something.

=== Comparisons and contrasts ===
Comparisons and contrasts may be marked by stress (or by other prosodic means), by particles like "too", or by comparatives constructions.

- Marianne called Adolph a male chauvinist, and then HE insulted HER.
  »For Marianne to call Adolph a male chauvinist would be to insult him.
- Carol is a better linguist than Barbara.
  »Barbara is a linguist.

=== Counterfactual conditionals ===
- If the notice had only said 'mine-field' in Welsh as well as in English, we would never have lost poor Llewellyn.
  »The notice didn't say 'mine-field' in Welsh.

=== Questions ===
Questions often presuppose what the assertive part of the question presupposes, but interrogative parts might introduce further presuppositions. There are three different types of questions: yes/no questions, alternative questions and WH-questions.

- Is there a professor of linguistics at MIT?
  »Either there is a professor of linguistics at MIT or there isn't.
- Is Newcastle in England or in Australia?
  »Newcastle is in England or Newcastle is in Australia.
- Who is the professor of linguistics at MIT?
  »Someone is the professor of linguistics at MIT.

=== Possessive case ===
- John's children are very noisy.
  »John has children.

== Accommodation of presuppositions ==
A presupposition of a sentence must normally be part of the common ground of the utterance context (the shared knowledge of the interlocutors) in order for the sentence to be felicitous. Sometimes, however, sentences may carry presuppositions that are not part of the common ground and nevertheless be felicitous. For example, I can, upon being introduced to someone, out of the blue explain that my wife is a dentist, this without my addressee having ever heard, or having any reason to believe that I have a wife. In order to be able to interpret my utterance, the addressee must assume that I have a wife. This process of an addressee assuming that a presupposition is true, even in the absence of explicit information that it is, is usually called presupposition accommodation. We have just seen that presupposition triggers like my wife (definite descriptions) allow for such accommodation. In "Presupposition and Anaphora: Remarks on the Formulation of the Projection Problem", the philosopher Saul Kripke noted that some presupposition triggers do not seem to permit such accommodation. An example of that is the presupposition trigger too. This word triggers the presupposition that, roughly, something parallel to what is stated has happened. For example, if pronounced with emphasis on John, the following sentence triggers the presupposition that somebody other than John had dinner in New York last night.

John had dinner in New York last night, too.

But that presupposition, as stated, is completely trivial, given what we know about New York. Several million people had dinner in New York last night, and that in itself doesn't satisfy the presupposition of the sentence. What is needed for the sentence to be felicitous is really that somebody relevant to the interlocutors had dinner in New York last night, and that this has been mentioned in the previous discourse, or that this information can be recovered from it. Presupposition triggers that disallow accommodation are called anaphoric presupposition triggers.

== Presupposition in critical discourse analysis ==
Critical discourse analysis (CDA) is a broad study belonging to not one research category. It focuses on identifying presuppositions of an abstract nature from varying perspectives. CDA is considered critical, not only in the sense of being analytical, but also in the ideological sense. Through the analysis of written texts and verbal speech, Teun A. van Dijk (2003) says CDA studies power imbalances existing in both the conversational and political spectrum. With the purpose of first identifying and then tackling inequality in society, van Dijk describes CDA as a nonconformist piece of work. One notable feature of ideological presuppositions researched in CDA is a concept termed synthetic personalisation

== Logical construct ==
To describe a presupposition in the context of propositional calculus and truth-bearers, Belnap defines "A sentence is a presupposition of a question if the truth of the sentence is a necessary condition of the question's having some true answer." Then referring to the semantic theory of truth, interpretations are used to formulate a presupposition: "Every interpretation which makes the question truly answerable is an interpretation which makes the presupposed sentence true as well."

A sentence that expresses a presupposition in a question may be characterized as follows: the question has some true answer if and only if the sentence is true.

== See also ==
- Common ground
- Conversational scoreboard
- Context (linguistics)
- Double-barreled question
- Dynamic semantics
- Fallacy of many questions
- Intertextuality
- Loaded question
- Performative contradiction
- Speech act
- Strawson entailment
