= Irene Heim =

American linguist (born 1954)

- Born: Irene Roswitha Heim; October 30, 1954; Munich, West Germany
- Awards: Rolf Schock Prize; Fellow of the Linguistic Society of America

Academic background
- Education: UMass Amherst
- Thesis: The Semantics of Definite and Indefinite Noun Phrases (1982)
- Doctoral advisor: Barbara Partee

Academic work
- Discipline: Semantics; Linguistics
- Institutions: MIT; UCLA; UT Austin

Irene Roswitha Heim (born October 30, 1954) is a German-American linguist and a leading specialist in semantics. She was a professor at the University of Texas at Austin (UT Austin) and University of California, Los Angeles (UCLA) before moving to the Massachusetts Institute of Technology (MIT) in 1989, where she is professor emerita of linguistics. She served as head of the Linguistics Section of the Department of Linguistics and Philosophy.

== Biography ==
Heim's parents were German speakers born in Czechoslovakia, who had immigrated to Germany after World War II. She attended school in Munich, and studied at the University of Konstanz and LMU Munich, graduating from the latter in 1978 with an M.A. in Linguistics and Philosophy and a minor in mathematics. Following this, she studied for a PhD at the University of Massachusetts Amherst, completing her dissertation in 1982.

After short-term postdoctoral positions at Stanford University, the Massachusetts Institute of Technology (MIT), the University of Texas at Austin (1983-1987), and the University of California, Los Angeles (UCLA), she took up a faculty position at MIT in 1987, receiving tenure as an associate professor in 1993 and becoming promoted to full professor in 1997.

== Research ==
Heim's work played a crucial role in establishing formal semantics as a part of linguistic theory. Her 1982 dissertation The semantics of definite and indefinite noun phrases is considered a classic text and a major milestone in formal semantics. In the second chapter of the work she argued (developing an insight by the philosopher David Lewis) that indefinite noun phrases like a cat in the sentence If a cat is not in Athens, she is in Rhodes are not quantifiers but free variables bound by an existential operator inserted in the sentence by a semantic operation that she dubbed existential closure. In the third chapter of the work she developed a compositional dynamic theory of (in)definites. This work, along with Hans Kamp's roughly contemporaneous 'A Theory of Truth and Semantic Representation' (1981), became the founding work in the influential tradition of dynamic semantics and the first compositional dynamic fragment.

She is the co-author with Angelika Kratzer of Semantics in Generative Grammar, an influential textbook of formal semantics, and was a founding co-editor (also with Kratzer) of the journal Natural Language Semantics.

== Awards ==
In 2010, Irene Heim was awarded a Senior Fellowship of the Zukunftskolleg at the University of Konstanz.

In 2012, she was inducted as a Fellow of the Linguistic Society of America.

In 2014, Heim was the recipient of a festschrift, The Art and Craft of Semantics.

In 2024, she was awarded the Rolf Schock Prize jointly with Hans Kamp.
