= Echo question =

Type of question

An echo question is a question that seeks to confirm or clarify another speaker's utterance (the stimulus), by repeating it back in some form. For example:

A: I'm moving to Greenland.
B: You're moving where?

In English, echo questions have a distinctive prosody, featuring a rising intonation. A speaker may use an echo question to seek confirmation because they find the stimulus surprising, or simply because they did not hear it clearly. Echo questions have unusual syntactic properties (including a lack of wh-movement), which have made them a challenge to account for in linguistic theories of questions.

== Function ==
Echo questions are primarily used to seek a confirmation or repetition of some portion of the stimulus, either because the listener finds what they thought they heard surprising or was unable to hear the speaker clearly.

The Cambridge Grammar of the English Language identifies another use, where the listener seeks a reformulation of some part of the stimulus, as in:

A: I'm taking him to the dance.
B: You're taking who to the dance?

These also permit polar forms such as:

B: You're taking James to the dance?

The CGEL terms these clarification echoes and notes that they differ in intonation from prototypical (or repetition) echo questions, but are syntactically of a kind.

== Classification ==
As with questions more broadly, echo questions may be classified according to the set of answers they permit as either polar (yes/no), variable, or alternative (though these are rare). The following examples are all in response to the stimulus "He saw a crocodile."

Polar
He saw a crocodile?
Variable
He saw a what?
Alternative
He saw a crocodile or an alligator?

A polar echo question (also known as a pure echo) repeats some or all of the stimulus, with a rising intonation. It bears some similarity to the rising declarative.

A variable echo question involves substituting one (or more) elements of the stimulus with a wh word. Unlike a normal variable question, echoes do not exhibit wh-fronting or subject–auxiliary inversion.

=== Bare predication ===
A special case of polar echo questions is the bare predication construction (also called the incredulity response). It combines a subject with either a non-finite verb phrase:

A: Alice worried about the price of the tickets.
B: Alice, worry?

...or a predicative complement:

A: She's totally bankrupt.
B: Her, bankrupt?

When the subject is a pronoun, it appears in accusative case.

=== Pseudo echo questions ===
A response may echo the content of a stimulus and have similar intonation to an echo question, but follow the syntactic rules of a normal question (including wh-fronting and subject-auxiliary inversion), as in:

A: He saw a crocodile.
B: What did he see?

Some authors include these among echo questions while others do not. Nicholas Sobin terms these "pseudo echo questions".

== Range of wh-substitution ==
What and other wh- words have a much more flexible distribution in echo questions than in ordinary wh- questions. For example, they may stand in for sub-word units:

A: I matriculated at Stanford.
B: You what-ulated?

Rarely, an echo question may include multiple variables:

A: I got a Tamagotchi from eBay.
B: You got a what from where?

However, certain words like prepositions and quantifiers may be focused in polar echo questions, but do not have a corresponding variable echo question:

A: She had on a bra over her t-shirt.
B: She had on a bra over her t-shirt?
B: * She had on a bra {what,where} her t-shirt?

== Modification of stimulus ==
An echo question need not exactly repeat the stimulus. First or second person pronouns will be inverted to reflect the change of speaker:

A: I ate your plums.
B: You ate my plums?

Echo questions may also reduce the original stimulus by omitting portions, or replacing them with pro-forms. For example, all of the following are possible echo question responses to the stimulus "He's taking their dalmatian puppy to the vet once his mom gets back with the car." (the focused constituent is marked in italics):

Their what puppy?
He's taking their puppy where?
Once who gets back?
He's taking it to the vet?

Rodney Huddleston accounts for such modifications by theorizing that the relevant repetition is of the illocutionary act associated with the stimulus, rather than its surface form.

== Intonation ==
Some languages, including English and German, feature a distinctive 'echo intonation'. Japanese does not have a dedicated intonational pattern for echo questions, but they may optionally be marked lexically with the sentence-final particle -tte.

== Relation with clause type ==
The stimulus may be of any clause type (declarative, interrogative, imperative, or exclamative), and may not even be a complete clause:

A: Hi darling.
B: Hi who?

The Cambridge Grammar of the English Language does not classify echo questions as a distinct clause type. Rather, it treats them as having the same syntactic form as the stimuli they echo. For example, an echo of an imperative clause is also an imperative clause, as in:

A: Bring me the axe.
B: Bring you the what?

Eun-Ju Noh disputes this treatment of echo questions as indirect speech acts, and argues that, syntactically, all echo questions should be understood as interrogatives.

=== Echoes of questions ===
The stimulus may itself be a question, giving rise to a "second-order" echo question:

A: Where's your cravat?
[1 - variable] B: Where's my what?
[2 - polar]    B: Where's my cravat?

It would not be appropriate for A to respond to 2 with something like "in your top drawer", since the echo question is effectively equivalent to "Did you ask me where my cravat is?" or "Did you say 'Where's my cravat?'?". Rather, a typical answer would be something like "Yes, where is it?", or "No, I said 'Where's your civet?'".

== See also ==
- Echo answer
