= Simplification of disjunctive antecedents =

Phenomenon for disjunction in conditional propositions

In formal semantics and philosophical logic, simplification of disjunctive antecedents (SDA) is the phenomenon whereby a disjunction in the antecedent of a conditional appears to distribute over the conditional as a whole. This inference is shown schematically below:

1. $(A \lor B) \Rightarrow C \models (A \Rightarrow C) \land (B \Rightarrow C)$

This inference has been argued to be valid on the basis of sentence pairs such as that below, since Sentence 1 seems to imply Sentence 2.

1. If Yde or Dani had come to the party, it would have been fun.
2. If Yde had come to the party, it would be been fun and if Dani had come to the party, it would have been fun.

The SDA inference was first discussed as a potential problem for the similarity analysis of counterfactuals. In these approaches, a counterfactual $(A \lor B) > C$ is predicted to be true if $C$ holds throughout the possible worlds where $A \lor B$ holds which are most similar to the world of evaluation. On a Boolean semantics for disjunction, $A \lor B$ can hold at a world simply in virtue of $A$ being true there, meaning that the most similar $A \lor B$-worlds could all be ones where $A$ holds but $B$ does not. If $C$ is also true at these worlds but not at the closest worlds here $B$ is true, then this approach will predict a failure of SDA: $(A \lor B) > C$ will be true at the world of evaluation while $(B > C)$ will be false.

In more intuitive terms, imagine that Yde missed the most recent party because he happened to get a flat tire while Dani missed it because she hates parties and is also deceased. In all of the closest worlds where either Yde or Dani comes to the party, it will be Yde and not Dani who attends. If Yde is a fun person to have at parties, this will mean that Sentence 1 above is predicted to be true on the similarity approach. However, if Dani tends to have the opposite effect on parties she attends, then Sentence 2 is predicted false, in violation of SDA.

SDA has been analyzed in a variety of ways. One is to derive it as a semantic entailment by positing a non-classical treatment of disjunction such as that of alternative semantics or inquisitive semantics. Another approach also derives it as a semantic entailment, but does so by adopting an alternative denotation for conditionals such as the strict conditional or any of the options made available in situation semantics. Finally, some researchers have suggested that it can be analyzed as a pragmatic implicature derived on the basis of classical disjunction and a standard semantics for conditionals. SDA is sometimes considered an embedded instance of the free choice inference.

== See also ==
- Disjunction
- Modal logic
- Free choice inference
