= Logical disjunction =

Logical connective OR

OR
- Definition: $x+y$
- Truth table: $(1110)$
- Logic gate

Normal forms
- Disjunctive: $x+y$
- Conjunctive: $x+y$
- Zhegalkin polynomial: $x \oplus y \oplus xy$

Post's lattices
- 0-preserving: yes
- 1-preserving: yes
- Monotone: yes
- Affine: no
- Self-dual: no

Venn diagram of $\scriptstyle A \lor B \lor C$

In logic, disjunction (also known as logical disjunction, logical or, logical addition, or inclusive disjunction) is a logical connective typically notated as ∨ and read aloud as "or". For instance, the English language sentence "it is sunny or it is warm" can be represented in logic using the disjunctive formula S ∨ W, assuming that S abbreviates "it is sunny" and W abbreviates "it is warm".

In classical logic, disjunction is given a truth functional semantics according to which a formula $\phi \lor \psi$ is true unless both $\phi$ and $\psi$ are false. Because this semantics allows a disjunctive formula to be true when both of its disjuncts are true, it is an inclusive interpretation of disjunction, in contrast with exclusive disjunction. Classical proof theoretical treatments are often given in terms of rules such as disjunction introduction and disjunction elimination. Disjunction has also been given numerous non-classical treatments, motivated by problems including Aristotle's sea battle argument, Heisenberg's uncertainty principle, as well as the numerous mismatches between classical disjunction and its nearest equivalents in natural languages.

An operand of a disjunction is a disjunct.

== Inclusive and exclusive disjunction ==
Because the logical or means a disjunction formula is true when either one or both of its parts are true, it is referred to as an inclusive disjunction. This is in contrast with an exclusive disjunction, which is true when one or the other of the arguments is true, but not both (referred to as exclusive or, or XOR).

When it is necessary to clarify whether inclusive or exclusive or is intended, English speakers sometimes use the phrase and/or. In terms of logic, this phrase is identical to or, but makes the inclusion of both being true explicit.

== Notation ==
In logic and related fields, disjunction is customarily notated with an infix operator ∨ (Unicode U+2228 ∨ LOGICAL OR). Alternative notations include +, used mainly in electronics, as well as | and || in many programming languages. The English word or is sometimes used as well, often in capital letters. In Jan Łukasiewicz's prefix notation for logic, the operator is A, short for Polish alternatywa (English: alternative).

In mathematics, the disjunction of an arbitrary number of elements $a_1, \ldots, a_n$ can be denoted as an iterated binary operation using a larger ⋁ (Unicode U+22C1 ⋁ N-ARY LOGICAL OR):

$\bigvee_{i=1}^{n} a_i = a_1 \lor a_2 \lor \ldots a_{n-1} \lor a_{n}$

== Classical disjunction ==
=== Semantics ===
In the semantics of logic, classical disjunction is a truth functional operation which returns the truth value true unless both of its arguments are false. Its semantic entry is standardly given as follows: (Note: For the sake of generality across classical systems, this entry suppresses the parameters of evaluation. The double turnstile symbol $\models$ here is intended to mean "semantically entails".)

$\models \phi \lor \psi$ if $\models \phi$ or $\models \psi$ or both

This semantics corresponds to the following truth table:

| $A$ | $B$ | $A \lor B$ |
|---|---|---|
| F | F | F |
| F | T | T |
| T | F | T |
| T | T | T |

=== Defined by other operators ===
In classical logic systems where logical disjunction is not a primitive, it can be defined in terms of the primitive and (∧) and not (¬) as:

A ∨ B = ¬((¬A) ∧ (¬B))

Alternatively, it may be defined in terms of implies ($\to$) and not as:

A ∨ B = (¬A) → B

The latter can be checked by the following truth table:

| $A$ | $B$ | $\neg A$ | $\neg A \rightarrow B$ | $A \or B$ |
|---|---|---|---|---|
| F | F | T | F | F |
| F | T | T | T | T |
| T | F | F | T | T |
| T | T | F | T | T |

It may also be defined solely in terms of $\to$:
$$A \lor B = (A \to B) \to B.$$
It can be checked by the following truth table:

| $A$ | $B$ | $A \rightarrow B$ | $(A \rightarrow B) \rightarrow B$ | $A \or B$ |
|---|---|---|---|---|
| F | F | T | F | F |
| F | T | T | T | T |
| T | F | F | T | T |
| T | T | T | T | T |

=== Properties ===
The following properties apply to disjunction:

- Associativity: a ∨ (b ∨ c) ≡ (a ∨ b) ∨ c
- Commutativity: a ∨ b ≡ b ∨ a
- Distributivity: (a ∧ (b ∨ c)) ≡ ((a ∧ b) ∨ (a ∧ c))
  - (a ∨ (b ∧ c)) ≡ ((a ∨ b) ∧ (a ∨ c))
  - (a ∨ (b ∨ c)) ≡ ((a ∨ b) ∨ (a ∨ c))
  - (a ∨ (b ≡ c)) ≡ ((a ∨ b) ≡ (a ∨ c))
- Idempotency: a ∨ a ≡ a
- Monotonicity: (a → b) → ((c ∨ a) → (c ∨ b))
  - (a → b) → ((a ∨ c) → (b ∨ c))
- Truth-preserving: The interpretation under which all variables are assigned a truth value of 'true', produces a truth value of 'true' as a result of disjunction.
- Falsehood-preserving: The interpretation under which all variables are assigned a truth value of 'false', produces a truth value of 'false' as a result of disjunction.

== Applications in computer science ==
OR logic gate

Operators corresponding to logical disjunction exist in most programming languages.

=== Bitwise operation ===
Disjunction is often used for bitwise operations. Examples:

- 0 or 0 = 0
- 0 or 1 = 1
- 1 or 0 = 1
- 1 or 1 = 1
- 1010 or 1100 = 1110

The or operator can be used to set bits in a bit field to 1, by or-ing the field with a constant field with the relevant bits set to 1. For example, x = x | 0b00000001 will force the final bit to 1, while leaving other bits unchanged.

=== Logical operation ===
Many languages distinguish between bitwise and logical disjunction by providing two distinct operators; in languages following C, bitwise disjunction is performed with the single pipe operator (|), and logical disjunction with the double pipe (||) operator.

Logical disjunction is usually short-circuited; that is, if the first (left) operand evaluates to true, then the second (right) operand is not evaluated. The logical disjunction operator thus usually constitutes a sequence point.

In a parallel (concurrent) language, it is possible to short-circuit both sides: they are evaluated in parallel, and if one terminates with value true, the other is interrupted. This operator is thus called the parallel or.

Although the type of a logical disjunction expression is Boolean in most languages (and thus can only have the value true or false), in some languages (such as Python and JavaScript), the logical disjunction operator returns one of its operands: the first operand if it evaluates to a true value, and the second operand otherwise. This allows it to fulfill the role of the Elvis operator.

=== Constructive disjunction ===
The Curry–Howard correspondence relates a constructivist form of disjunction to tagged union types.

== Set theory ==
The membership of an element of a union set in set theory is defined in terms of a logical disjunction: $x\in A\cup B\Leftrightarrow (x\in A)\vee(x\in B)$. Because of this, logical disjunction satisfies many of the same identities as set-theoretic union, such as associativity, commutativity, distributivity, and de Morgan's laws, identifying logical conjunction with set intersection, logical negation with set complement.

== Natural language ==
Disjunction in natural languages does not precisely match the interpretation of ∨ in classical logic. Notably, classical disjunction is inclusive while natural language disjunction is often understood exclusively, as the following English example typically would be.

- Mary is eating an apple or a pear.

This inference has sometimes been understood as an entailment, for instance by Alfred Tarski, who suggested that natural language disjunction is ambiguous between a classical and a nonclassical interpretation. More recent work in pragmatics has shown that this inference can be derived as a conversational implicature on the basis of a semantic denotation which behaves classically. However, disjunctive constructions including Hungarian vagy... vagy and French soit... soit have been argued to be inherently exclusive, rendering ungrammaticality in contexts where an inclusive reading would otherwise be forced.

Similar deviations from classical logic have been noted in cases such as free choice disjunction and simplification of disjunctive antecedents, where certain modal operators trigger a conjunction-like interpretation of disjunction. As with exclusivity, these inferences have been analyzed both as implicatures and as entailments arising from a nonclassical interpretation of disjunction.

- You can have an apple or a pear.

$\rightsquigarrow$ You can have an apple and you can have a pear (but you cannot have both)

In many languages, disjunctive expressions play a role in question formation.

- Is Mary a philosopher or a linguist?

For instance, while the above English example can be interpreted as a polar question asking whether it's true that Mary is either a philosopher or a linguist, it can also be interpreted as an alternative question asking which of the two professions is hers. The role of disjunction in these cases has been analyzed using nonclassical logics such as alternative semantics and inquisitive semantics, which have also been adopted to explain the free choice and simplification inferences.

In English, as in many other languages, disjunction is expressed by a coordinating conjunction. Other languages express disjunctive meanings in a variety of ways, though it is unknown whether disjunction itself is a linguistic universal. In many languages such as Dyirbal and Maricopa, disjunction is marked using a verb suffix. For instance, in the Maricopa example below, disjunction is marked by the suffix šaa.

Johnš Billš vʔaawuumšaa
John-NOM Bill-NOM 3-come-PL-FUT-INFER
'John or Bill will come.'

== See also ==
- Affirming a disjunct
- Boolean algebra (logic)
- Boolean algebra topics
- Boolean domain
- Boolean function
- Boolean-valued function
- Conjunction/disjunction duality
- Disjunctive syllogism
- Fréchet inequalities
- Free choice inference
- Hurford disjunction
- Logical graph
- Simplification of disjunctive antecedents

== Notes ==
- George Boole, closely following analogy with ordinary mathematics, premised, as a necessary condition to the definition of x + y, that x and y were mutually exclusive. Jevons, and practically all mathematical logicians after him, advocated, on various grounds, the definition of logical addition in a form that does not necessitate mutual exclusiveness.
