= Responsive predicate =

Predicate which can take declarative or interrogative subclause

In formal semantics a responsive predicate is an embedding predicate which can take either a declarative or an interrogative complement. For instance, the English verb know is responsive as shown by the following examples.

1. Bill knows whether Mary left.
2. Bill knows that Mary left.

Responsives are contrasted with rogatives such as wonder which can only take an interrogative complement and anti-rogatives such as believe which can only take a declarative complement.

1. Bill wonders whether Mary left.
2. *Bill wonders that Mary left.
3. *Bill believes whether Mary left.
4. Bill believes that Mary left.

Some analyses have derived these distinctions from type compatibility while others explain them in terms of particular properties of the embedding verbs and their complements.

== See also ==
- Embedded clause
- Propositional attitude
- Inquisitive semantics
- Interrogative clause
- Question
