= Erotetics =

Logic of questions and answers

Erotetics or erotetic logic is a part of logic, devoted to logical analysis of questions. It is sometimes called the logic of questions and answers.

== Overview ==
The idea was originally developed by Richard Whately in the mid-19th century. For example, he noted the ambiguity of the interrogation "Why?" (1) It could be a reason, such as why the angles of a triangle sum to two right angles, or (2) a cause, such as why days are shorter in winter than summer, or (3) a design requirement as in a timepiece.

In 1936 Whately's work was revived by Eugeniu Sperantia. In 1955 Mary and Arthur Prior recalled Whately's suggestion for a variable copula to write questions symbolically. Recognizing the consequent symbolic calculus, they note that it is insufficient for the logic of interrogatives, which is antisymbolic.

In 1940 R. G. Collingwood published An Essay on Metaphysics in which he examined presuppositions in statements and questions. In fact he claimed "Every statement that anybody ever makes is made in the answer to a question." By way of explanation, he wrote "In proportion as a man is thinking scientifically when he makes a statement, he knows the statement is the answer to a question and he knows what the question is." In this sense, when thinking is scientifically ordered, a question is logically prior to its own answer. Collingwood also asserts that "Each question involves a presupposition."

In 1966 Nuel D. Belnap, Jr. wrote on "Questions, Answers, and Presuppositions".

In 1963 MIT Press published Communication: A Logical Model by David Harrah that focused on questions as pivotal in communication. The same year Belnap published An Analysis of Questions: Preliminary Report. C. L. Hamblin reviewed the works of Harrah and Belnap together: he considered them a launching of erotetics into serious consideration. Later, Nuel Belnap and T. B. Steel Jr. wrote The Logic of Questions and Answers (1976), which came at a watershed moment: while purportedly continuing the philosophical investigation of Harrah, they anticipated query languages and data base management systems. The bibliography included 25 references on question answering and natural language understanding.

For most of the time, researchers concentrated on the relation between questions and answers. Recently, more attention is given to the way questions come from sentences or other questions, similar to entailment. Some contributions in this direction are Jaakko Hintikka's interrogative model and Andrzej Wiśniewski's inferential erotetic logic (IEL). In the interrogative model, questioning is seen as game played between two parties. One of these parties may be reality.

In 2011 Anna Brożek published The Theory of Questions which started with philosophical context (ontology, epistemology), then use in human intercommunication, with a consideration of cognition and answers. Embedded questions and situational analysis are noted, as well as specific considerations with regard to science, psychology, and surveys. Concluding chapters consider legal proceedings, philosophical questions, and the history of erotetic study in Poland in the 20th-century.

Erotetics has been used for insight into teaching: "To teach someone something is to answer that person’s questions about some subject matter."

== See also ==
- Complex question
- Contingent question
- Display and referential questions
- Leading question
- Loaded question
- Open-ended question
- Rhetorical question
- Scientific question
- Socratic method
- Suggestive question

== Sources ==
- Whately, Richard (1875) Elements of Logic, Longman, Green & Co. (9th Edition, London)
- Jaakko Hintikka (1999) Inquiry as Inquiry: A Logic of Scientific Discovery, Springer books ISBN 0-7923-5477-X
- Nicholas Rescher (2000) Inquiry Dynamics, Transaction Publishers ISBN 0-7658-0007-1
- Andrzej Wiśniewski (1995) The Posing of Logical Questions, Springer Netherlands.
