= Free choice inference =

Phenomenon in natural language

Free choice is a phenomenon in natural language where a linguistic disjunction appears to receive a logical conjunctive interpretation when it interacts with a modal operator. For example, the following English sentences can be interpreted to mean that the addressee can watch a movie and that they can also play video games, depending on their preference:

1. You can watch a movie or play video games.
2. You can watch a movie or you can play video games.

Free choice inferences are a major topic of research in formal semantics and philosophical logic because they are not valid in classical systems of modal logic. If they were valid, then the semantics of natural language would validate the Free Choice Principle.

1. Free Choice Principle: $\Diamond( P \lor Q) \rightarrow (\Diamond P \land \Diamond Q)$

This symbolic logic formula above is not valid in classical modal logic: Adding this principle as an axiom to standard modal logics would allow one to conclude $\Diamond Q$ from $\Diamond P$, for any $P$ and $Q$. This observation is known as the Paradox of Free Choice. To resolve this paradox, some researchers have proposed analyses of free choice within nonclassical frameworks such as dynamic semantics, linear logic, alternative semantics, and inquisitive semantics. Others have proposed ways of deriving free choice inferences as scalar implicatures which arise on the basis of classical lexical entries for disjunction and modality.

Free choice inferences are most widely studied for deontic modals, but also arise with other flavors of modality as well as imperatives, conditionals, and other kinds of operators. Indefinite noun phrases give rise to a similar inference which is also referred to as "free choice" though researchers disagree as to whether it forms a natural class with disjunctive free choice.

== See also ==
- Deontic logic
- Disjunction
- Hans Kamp
- Modal logic
- Ross's paradox
- Simplification of disjunctive antecedents
- Sluicing
