= Hurford disjunction =

Disjunction in formal semantics

In formal semantics, a Hurford disjunction is a disjunction in which one of the disjuncts entails the other. The concept was first identified by British linguist James Hurford. The sentence "Mary is in the Netherlands or she is in Amsterdam" is an example of a Hurford disjunction since one cannot be in Amsterdam without being in the Netherlands. Other examples are shown below:

1. #Tamina saw a Beatle or Paul McCartney.
2. #The number I'm thinking of is divisible by 4 or it's even.
3. #Is Wilbur a pig or an animal?

As indicated by the octothorps in the above examples, Hurford disjunctions are typically infelicitous. Their infelicity has been argued to arise from them being redundant, since simply uttering the stronger of the two disjuncts would have had the same semantic effect. Thus, they have been taken as motivation for a principle such as the following:

Local Redundancy: An utterance is infelicitous if its logical form contains an instance of a binary operator $\oplus$ applied to arguments $A$ or $B$, whose semantic contribution is contextually equivalent to that of either $A$ or $B$ on its own.

However, some particular instances of Hurford disjunctions are felicitous.

1. Sofia ate some of the pizza or all of it.
2. Henrietta is five feet tall or six feet tall.

Felicitous Hurford disjunctions have been analyzed by positing that the weaker disjunct is strengthened by an embedded scalar implicature which eliminates the entailment between the disjuncts. For instance, in the first of the felicitous examples above, the left disjunct's unenriched meaning is simply that Sofia ate a nonzero amount of pizza. This would result in a redundancy violation since eating all the pizza entails eating a nonzero amount of it. However, if an embedded scalar implicature enriches this disjunct so that it denotes the proposition that that Sofia ate some but not all of the pizza, this entailment no longer goes through. Eating all of the pizza does not entail eating some but not all of it. Thus, Local Redundancy will still be satisfied.

== See also ==
- Disjunction
- Implicature
