= Display and referential questions =

Questions for which the asker either already knows the answer or not

A display question (also called known-information question) is a type of question requiring the other party to demonstrate their knowledge on a subject matter when the questioner already knows the answer. They are contrasted with referential questions (or information-seeking questions), a type of question posed when the answer is not known by the questioner at the time of inquiry.

Both question types are used widely in language education in order to elicit language practice but the use of referential questions is generally preferred to the use of display questions in communicative language teaching. Display questions bear similarities to closed questions in terms of their requirement for short and limited answers and they can be classified under convergent questions. On the other hand, referential questions and open questions are similar in their requirement for long, often varied, answers, and can be grouped under divergent questions.

Both display and referential questions are subcategories of epistemic questions.

== Epistemic questions ==
Epistemic questions are questions that seek information. Subcategories of it includes display, referential, rhetorical and expressive questions.

== Context of usage ==
=== Language education classrooms ===
Long and Sato (1983) first applied the terms display and referential questions in the field of second language pedagogy, differentiating them according to the actions each type of question performs.

==== Examples ====
Richards and Schmidt give the following example of a display question:

Q: Is this a book?
A: Yes, it's a book.

Omari gives the following examples of a referential question:

Q: Which character in the story you admire most and why?
Q: What would you do if you were in the judge’s place?

==== Brainstorming ====
Referential questions are employed at higher rates when brainstorming a topic and gathering responses. As there is no one fixed answer to referential questions, they can be used to instigate genuine communication, thereby facilitating less restricted discourse and promoting greater creativity in the classroom.

==== Eliciting existing knowledge ====
Display questions work best for eliciting short and low-level answers that correspond to the answer already expected by the teacher. Since referential questions serve to request new information, answers can be subjective and varied based on the students' opinions, judgement and experiences. Students answer referential questions with the goal of assisting teachers in filling the information gaps.

==== Checking understanding ====
Display questions are mainly used as a means to evaluate whether the listener has understood what is needed. There is a tendency for display questions to be employed when addressing groups of people, such as in a classroom setting, and referential questions when addressing individuals. In addition, students' language proficiency greatly affects the chances of being asked display questions by the teacher. Teachers are more likely to ask display questions to a student with a lower proficiency on the topic being discussed. The teacher's teaching skills also correlates to the frequency at which display questions are asked. Less experienced teachers tend to ask more display questions.

A study by Barnes (1983) found that in universities, about 80% of the questions asked by the teachers are to recall facts. Questions by teachers tend to be display questions while student-initiated questions are referential (Markee, 1995).

==== Online communication ====
A study by Blanchette (2007) shows that in online communication, the teacher asked both referential and display questions while students asked only referential questions. This finding agrees with Markee's (1995) conclusion that the majority of student-initiated questions are referential. However, this is not because the participants only asked questions for which they did not know the answer. These questions can elicit numerous possible responses and therefore it reflects the higher cognitive levels in the questions.

=== Other institutional settings ===
Asymmetrical conversation is characteristic of institutional talk as opposed to everyday interactions among participants of equal status. As the use of display questions tends to reproduce asymmetrical conversation, they can be found in several institutional settings.

Display questions may sometimes be used by media interviewers and courtroom attorneys in the presence of a listening audience to assert their views or opinions. In a counsel-witness interaction, a counsel's question is directed at the witness with other participants acting as indirect receivers, and the witness's response is not in fact directed at the counsel, who typically already know the answer to their own questions, but at the judge and jury. This kind of interaction can be seen as a display talk. Similarly in media interviews, the follow-up is usually left to the listener or viewer following the interviews, unlike situations like classrooms and quizzes where a follow-up from the questioner on whether the answer is correct is present.

Doctors also often use known-information questions when interacting with patients. Even though they usually already possess the information, these questions are asked only to evaluate the patient through their responses. While the doctor might ask the patient for something in particular, the patient would understand the content of the question but they might not understand the point of it since the doctor already knows the answer.

== Communicative performance ==
Display questions are more directive than authentic questions, and they promote greater ability in thinking by spurring students to have to back up their contribution. Utilising display questions that build on previous statements made by the students in a rephrased or simplified form facilitates the production of a more elaborate dialogue. As output is an important part of language learning, pushed output is necessary in classrooms to engage the students and encourage them to talk in the language they are learning. There is a need to determine the effects of the question types on communicative classroom interaction and student output. Its effectiveness correlates to the authenticity in the second language classroom.

Referential questions are often seen as a way to add meaningful usage of a language. Output from the students solicited from referential questions appear three times as much than other question types, especially so for beginner classes, even though beginner language students were expected to interact less due to the limited knowledge of the language. When learners were asked referential questions, responses were found to be significantly longer and syntactically complex. Non-verbal communication and the need to use a dictionary also increased when responding to referential questions. Learners themselves are found to be more interested in referential question activity and agree that it is more conducive in bringing higher quality and quantity output, and that it also motivated interaction.

However, there are also studies that found no increase in learner response with referential questions. Where learners have little collective knowledge, bombarding students with questions is unlikely to garner increased output.

There is some evidence that implies that display questions are not as injurious as many think. Kachur & Prendergast (1997), cited in Boyd (2006), found that asking 70% authentic questions resulted in a lack of student participation, while lowering the amount to 32% resulted in the students being more engaged. This is explained as due to the ethos of mutual respect that is further studied by Christoph & Nystrand (2001). It is stated that in a classroom with mutual respect, the teachers and students are not inclined to introduce new topics. Instead, they extend topical episodes by being invested in listening and responding to the utterances of others.

== Cognitive effects ==
When plotted on an intellectual scale, display questions are deemed to be posed at low cognitive levels because such questions require only basic recollection of factual information, which is at the lowest level of the hierarchy. In contrast, referential questions, in calling for evaluation or judgement, are associated with the highest cognitive levels.

Finding the correct answer to display questions involves higher-level cognitive thinking. Beyond eliciting known information (on the asker's part) and recognizing the content of questions (on the askee's part), answering display questions also involves active consideration and interpretation of the way the questions are organised as each display question is designed with a specific answer in mind.

Questions that require lower cognitive levels to answer are seen as injurious, even though questioning holds a major role in classroom interaction. This type of question does not encourage participation nor does it stimulate student thinking. Studies by Barnes (1983), Fischer and Grant (1983) as cited by Blanchette (2007) have found that instructors at the post-secondary level tend to ask questions of lower cognitive levels.

== Pragmatics and discourse ==
=== Nature of interaction ===
Classroom interaction features heavily in communicative language teaching, as it provides an avenue for language learners to practice conversing in the target language without judgement. The type of questions used to steer interaction is critical as it determines the types of responses that will be garnered.

==== Forced vs Natural ====
In cases of classroom interaction where more display questions are used as opposed to referential questions, participation appears forced and unnatural. This was found to be true regardless of whether the teacher doing the asking is experienced or otherwise. The exclusive or excessive use of display questions generally leads to lower instances of classroom communication.

Referential questions are seen as an effective method of increasing oral participation because it creates opportunities for students to voice their opinions. The added bonus that there is no one specific answer encourages students to be less afraid of making mistakes and be more productive.

==== Type of feedback ====
Display and referential questions form part of a question-answer sequence consisting of an initiation, response, and follow-up (IRF). A follow-up with an evaluative function, commenting on the response to a question, is a distinguishing element of classroom conversation, and the difference between sequences with evaluative follow-ups compared to those serving as acknowledgements has been regarded as a major difference between display and referential questions.

An example of responding with an acknowledgement:

Speaker A: What time is it, Denise?
Speaker B: 2:30
Speaker A: Thank you, Denise

An example of responding with an evaluation:

Speaker A: What time is it, Denise?
Speaker B: 2:30
Speaker A: Very good, Denise

The IRF sequence is commonly found in classroom discourse, of which display questions are a distinguishing feature. Feedback is important to a learner, so a teacher's follow-up would normally evaluate the learner's response with words like right or yes, sometimes including a repetition of the response for others to hear. Feedback is also important when students provide technically-correct answers but they are not what the teacher is looking for. An absence of feedback from the teacher can also be an indication to the student that his or her answer is wrong. IRF sequences in everyday discourse seldom include evaluative follow-ups, and responses in casual conversations often carry relational functions such as showing agreement or expressing a particular emotion.

There are opposing views on the use of IRF exchanges in the classroom setting. It has been seen as a poor and unproductive model for spoken interaction in the target language outside the classroom due to its failure in enabling students to learn the demands of everyday conversation. Too often, follow-ups are carried out by teachers, leading to learners having to take on the role of passive respondents without getting sufficient experience in performing requests and using listener follow-ups. This can be improved by allowing students to participate in peer-to-peer interactions as platforms to generate appropriate listener responses.

In contrast, typical IRF exchanges could still be useful in classroom situations where teachers assign the kind of interactional status that helps learners be actively involved in the interactions. Productive use of conversational responses in peer-to-peer speech practices could be eventually achieved if teachers provide exposure to and guidance on the use of follow-ups.

=== Turn-taking ===
Display questions are mostly found in the classroom in the three-turn sequence of initiation-response-evaluation (IRE). In this sequence, the teacher asks a question in the first turn, followed with a reply from a student in the second turn. Upon going back to the teacher in the next turn, the teacher gives feedback on the adequacy of the student's response. This sequence is considered structurally robust. Teachers can continuously go through interactional revision when continuing the conversation with a student using this sequence. This allows for methodical revision and negotiation between speakers. As the teacher analyses a student's replies and reformulates the next question, each preceding question becomes a point of reference and thus becomes an interpretive resource based on the teacher's analysis and decisions derived from the prior exchange.

==== Frequency of turns ====
The use of referential questions in classroom discourse promotes a significantly higher number of speaking turns as compared to the usage of display questions.

It is often assumed that display questions are less engaging than referential questions. However, depending on the process of how the teacher uses the display questions, and what they achieve from those processes, display questions can become an effective teaching variable in lessons.

==== Duration between turns ====
Responses to display questions have been found to be rather prompt in that they only require factual recall. Referential questions are known to elicit higher-order responses resulting from critical thinking. Thus, there is typically a longer wait-time between turns where referential questions are involved.

However, responses to referential questions do not always take the form of complex utterances. The following example is a case in point:

Teacher: Can you swim?
Student: Yes, I can.

In the same vein, display questions do not always garner immediate responses because the language learner may have the knowledge but lack the vocabulary to express it, thereby contributing to a longer wait-time.

== See also ==
- Rhetorical question
- Closed-ended question
- Open-ended question
- Epistemology
- Language acquisition
