= Anna Brożek =

Polish philosopher

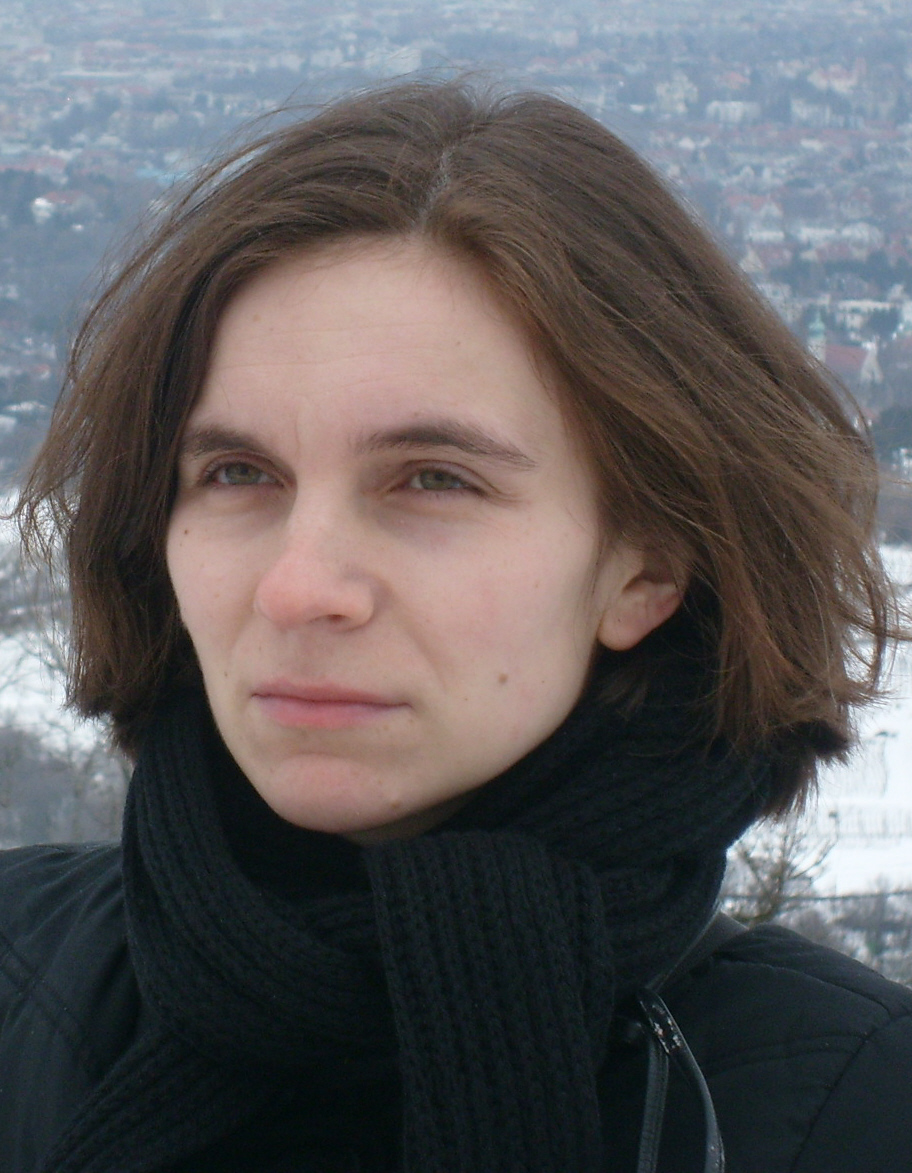
- Born: 11 May 1980 (age 46); Kraków, Poland
- Education: Academy of Music in Kraków, Pontifical University of John Paul II
- Occupations: Musician, philosopher
- Years active: 2003-present

Anna Magdalena Brożek (born 11 May 1980 in Kraków) is a Polish philosopher and musician.

== Life ==
Brożek studied piano at the Academy of Music in Kraków in 1999–2004, and at the Fryderyk Chopin University of Music in 2006–2008. At the same time, she studied philosophy at the Pontifical University of John Paul II from 1999 to 2003. Between 2004 and 2006, she completed her PhD studies in philosophy at Warsaw University, gaining her habilitation in 2008, and titular professorship in 2015.

She currently works at the Department of Logical Semiotics at the Faculty of Philosophy, University of Warsaw, where she is the head of the Laboratory of the Methodology of the Humanities - and the Lvov-Warsaw School Research Center. She is also a member of the Scientific Council of Collegium Invisibile. For the term of 2016–2021, she was elected to the Academy of Young Scholars of the Polish Academy of Sciences. She became a winner of the 2017 National Science Center Award in the field of humanities, social sciences and art.

== Publications ==
=== Authored Books ===
- Symetria w muzyce [Symmetry in music]. Kraków: OBI. 2004. ISBN 83-7332-210-8.
- Principia musica : logiczna analiza terminologii muzycznej [Principia musica: logical analysis of musical terminology]. Warsaw: Wydawnictwo Naukowe Semper. 2006. ISBN 978-83-7507-002-6.
- Wprowadzenie do metodologii : dla studentów teorii muzyki i muzykologii [Introduction to the methodology: for students of music theory and musicology]. Warsaw: Wydawnictwo Naukowe Semper. 2007. ISBN 978-83-7507-017-0.
- Pytania i odpowiedzi : tło filozoficzne, teoria i zastosowania praktyczne [Questions and Answers: philosophical background, theory and practical applications]. Warsaw: Wydawnictwo Naukowe Semper. 2007. ISBN 978-83-7507-024-8.
- Fakty i artefakty [Facts and Artifacts]. Warsaw: Wydawnictwo Naukowe Semper. 2010. ISBN 978-83-7507-141-2.
- Kazimierz Twardowski w Wiedniu [Kazimierz Twardowski in Vienna]. Warsaw: Wydawnictwo Naukowe Semper. 2010. ISBN 978-83-7507-081-1.
- Kazimierz Twardowski. Die Wiener Jahre. Wien & New York: Springer 2011. ISBN 978-3-7091-0770-6.
- Theory of Questions : erotetics through the prism of its philosophical background and practical applications. Amsterdam: Rodopi. 2011. ISBN 978-90-4203-446-4.
- Teoria imperatywów i jej zastosowania [Imperatives Theory and its Applications]. Kraków: Copernicus Center Press. 2012. ISBN 978-83-7886-004-4.
- Obraz duszy polskiej w mazurkach Romana Maciejewskiego [The Image of the Polish Soul in Roman Maciejewski’s Mazurkas]. Lublin: Polihymnia 2014. ISBN 978-83-7847-185-1.
- Piękno i prawda. Esej o relacjach między sztuką i nauką [Beauty and Truth. Essay on the Relationship between Art and Science]. Kraków: Copernicus Center Press 2017. ISBN 978-83-7886-304-5.
- Analiza i konstrukcja. O metodach badania pojęć w Szkole Lwowsko-Warszawskiej [Analysis and Construction. On the Methods of Researching Concepts at the Lvov-Warsaw School]. Kraków: Copernicus Center Press 2020. ISBN 978-83-7886-537-7.

=== Co-authored books ===
- [With Jacek Jadacki:] Fryderyk Chopin: środowisko społeczne – osobowość – światopogląd – założenia [Frederick Chopin: Social Background – Personality – Worldview – Artistic Principles]. Warsaw: Wydawnictwo Naukowe Semper 2010. ISBN 978-83-7507-087-3.
- [With Jacek Jadacki & Marian Przełęcki:] W poszukiwaniu najwyższych wartości. Rozmowy międzypokoleniowe [In Search of the Highest Values. Intergenerational Talks]. Warsaw: Wydawnictwo Naukowe Semper 2011. ISBN 978-83-7507-142-9.
- [With Bartosz Brożek & Jerzy Stelmach:] Fenomen normatywności [The Phenomenon of Normativity]. Kraków: Copernicus Center Press 2013. ISBN 978-83-7886-032-7.
- [With Marcin Będkowski, Alicja Chybińska, Stepan Ivanyk & Dominik Traczykowski:] Antyirracjonalizm. Metody filozoficzne w Szkole Lwowsko-Warszawskiej. Warsaw: Wydawnictwo Naukowe Semper 2020. ISBN 978-83-7507-292-1. English version: Anti-irrationalism. Methods in the Lvov-Warsaw School. Warsaw: Wydawnictwo Naukowe Semper 2020. ISBN 978-83-7507-301-0.

=== Edited and co-edited books ===
- [With Jacek Jadacki & Witold Strawiński:] Logic, Methodology and Philosophy of Science at Warsaw University. [2.] Warsaw: Wydawnictwo Naukowe Semper 2005. ISBN 83-89100-63-0.
- [With Witold Strawiński & Mariusz Grygianiec:] Myśli o języku, nauce i wartościach [Thoughts about Language, Science and Values]. Warsaw: Wydawnictwo Naukowe Semper 2006. ISBN 83-7507-000-9.
- Філософсвкі проблеми науки / Filozoficzne problemy nauki [Philosophical Problems of Science]. Львів & Warsaw: Wydawnictwo Naukowe Semper 2008. ISBN 978-83-7507-016-3.
- Logic, Methodology and Philosophy of Sciences at Warsaw University (3). Warsaw: Wydawnictwo Naukowe Semper 2008. ISBN 978-83-7507-026-2.
- [With Jagna Dankowska & Janina Tatarska:] Roman Maciejewski – twórca charyzmatyczny [Roman Maciejewski – A Charismatic Artist]. Poznań & Warsaw: Akademia Muzyczna im. I.J. Paderewskiego – Uniwersytet Muzyczny Fryderyka Chopina 2010. ISBN 978-83-88392-38-2, 978-83-61489-05-4.
- [With Jacek Jadacki & Berislav Žarnić:] Theory of Imperatives from Different Points of View. [1.] Logic, Methodology and Philosophy of Science at Warsaw University. [6.] Warsaw: Wydawnictwo Naukowe Semper 2011. ISBN 978-83-7507-078-1.
- [With Jacek Jadacki, Rosja Mastop & Berislav Žarnić:] Imperatives, Performatives and Norms in Social Reality [European Journal of Analytic Philosophy vol. 7, No. 2]. Rijeka: University of Rijeka 2011. ISSN 1845-8475.
- [With Jacek Jadacki & Berislave Žarnić:] Theory of Imperatives from Different Points of View. [2.] Logic, Methodology and Philosophy of Science at Warsaw University. [7.] Warsaw: Wydawnictwo Naukowe Semper 2013. ISBN 978-83-7507-205-1.
- Kazimierz Twardowski we Lwowie. O wielkim uczonym, nauczycielu i obywatelu [Kazimierz Twardowski in Lvov. About a Great Scientist, Teacher and Citizen]. Bydgoszcz: Oficyna Wydawnicza Epigram 2014. ISBN 978-83-61231-65-3.
- [With Jacek Jadacki:] Nauka i język (seria druga) [Science and Language (second series)]. Księga pamiątkowa Marianowi Przełęckiemu w darze na 90-lecie urodzin. Lublin: Norbertinum 2014. ISBN 978-83-7222-496-5.
- [With Alicja Chybińska, Jacek Jadacki & Jan Woleński:] Tradition of the Lvov-Warsaw School. Ideas and Continuations. Leiden & Boston: Brill/Rodopi 2015. ISBN 978-90-04-31175-6.
- [With Alicja Chybińska:] Fenomen Szkoły Lwowsko-Warszawskiej [The Phenomenon of the Lvov-Warsaw School]. Lublin: Wydawnictwo Academicon 2016. ISBN 978-83-62475-19-3.
- [With Alicja Chybińska, Mariusz Grygianiec & Marcin Tkaczyk:] Myśli o języku, nauce i wartościach. Seria druga [Thoughts about Language, Science and Values. Second series.]. Warsaw: Wydawnictwo Naukowe Semper 2016. ISBN 978-83-7507-203-7.
- [With Friedrich Stadler & Jan Woleński:] The Significance of the Lvov-Warsaw School in the European Culture. Wien: Vienna Circle Institute 2017. ISBN 978-3-319-52868-7.
- [With Marcin Będkowski, Alicja Chybińska, Stepan Ivanyk & Dominik Traczykowski:] Formal and Informal Methods in Philosophy. Leiden & Boston: Brill/Rodopi 2020. ISBN 978-90-04-42049-6.

=== Records ===
- Roman Maciejewski. Complete Piano Mazurkas. Sarton 2011.
