= Affirming a disjunct =

Formal fallacy

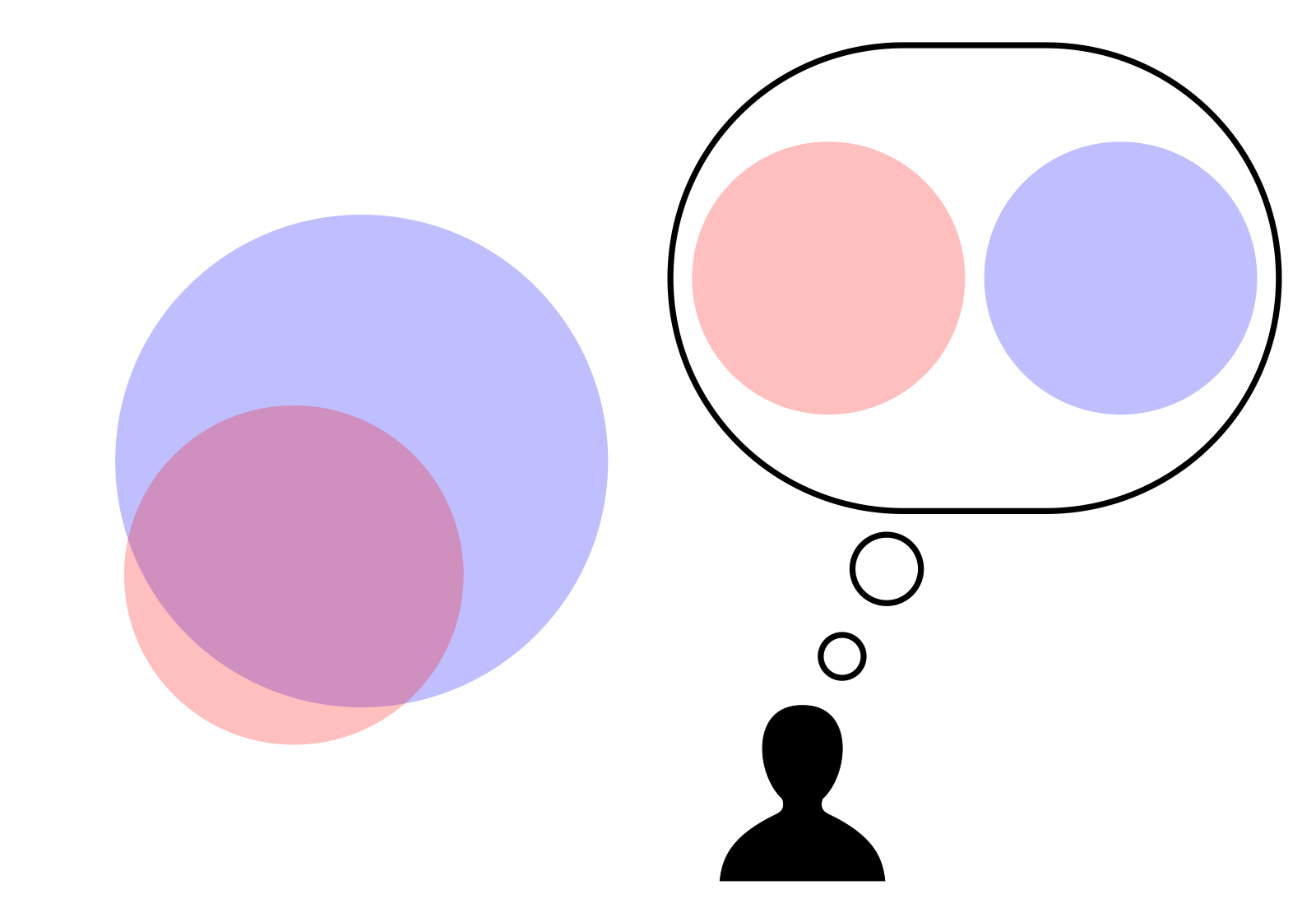
Affirming a disjunct is a formal logical fallacy.

The formal fallacy of affirming a disjunct, also known as the fallacy of the alternative disjunct or a false exclusionary disjunct, occurs when a deductive argument takes the following logical form:

1. A or B
2. A
3. Therefore, not B

Or in logical operators:

1. $p \vee q$
2. $p$
3. ${} \vdash {}$ ¬ $q$

Where ${} \vdash {}$ denotes a logical assertion.

== Explanation ==
Venn diagram for "A or B", with inclusive or (OR)

Venn diagram for "A or B", with exclusive or (XOR)

The fallacy lies in concluding that one disjunct must be false because the other disjunct is true; in fact they may both be true because "or" is defined inclusively rather than exclusively. It is a fallacy of equivocation between the operations OR and XOR.

Affirming the disjunct should not be confused with the valid argument known as disjunctive syllogism.

== Examples ==
The following argument indicates the unsoundness of affirming a disjunct:

1. Max is a mammal or Max is a cat.
2. Max is a mammal.
3. Therefore, Max is not a cat.

This inference is unsound because all cats, by definition, are mammals.

A second example provides a first proposition that appears realistic and shows how an obviously flawed conclusion still arises under this fallacy.

1. To be on the cover of Vogue Magazine, one must be a celebrity or very beautiful.
2. This month's cover was a celebrity.
3. Therefore, this celebrity is not very beautiful.

== See also ==
- Exclusive or – True when either but not both inputs are true
- Logical disjunction – Logical connective OR
- Syllogistic fallacy – Failure to parse arguments using Classical Logic
- Black or white thinking – Failure to think in nuances
