= Squiggle operator =

Linguistic formalism

In formal semantics, the squiggle operator $\sim$ is an operator that constrains the occurrence of focus. In one common definition, the squiggle operator takes a syntactic argument $\alpha$ and a discourse salient argument $C$ and introduces a presupposition that the ordinary semantic value of $C$ is either a subset or an element of the focus semantic value of $\alpha$. The squiggle was first introduced by Mats Rooth in 1992 as part of his treatment of focus within the framework of alternative semantics. It has become one of the standard tools in formal work on focus, playing a key role in accounts of contrastive focus, ellipsis, deaccenting, and question-answer congruence.

== Empirical motivation ==
The empirical motivation for the squiggle operator comes from cases in which focus marking requires a salient antecedent in discourse that stands in some particular relation with the focused expression. For instance, the following pairs shows that contrastive focus is only felicitous when there is a salient focus antecedent, which contrasts with the focused expression (capital letters indicate the focused expression).

1. (Helen likes stroopwafel) No, MANDY likes stroopwafel.
2. (Helen likes stroopwafel) #No, Mandy likes STROOPWAFEL.
1. An AMERICAN farmer was talking to a CANADIAN farmer.
2. ?? An AMERICAN farmer was talking to a Canadian FARMER.

Another instance of this phenomenon is question-answer congruence, also known as answer focus. Informally, a focused constituent in an answer to a question must represent the part of the utterance which resolves the issue raised by the question. For instance, the following pair of dialogues show that in response to a question of who likes stroopwafel, focus must be placed on the name of the person who likes stroopwafel. When focus is instead placed on the word "stroopwafel" itself, the answer is infelicitous, as is indicated by the # sign.

1. Q: Who likes stroopwafel?
  A: HELEN likes stroopwafel.
2. Q: Who likes stroopwafel?
  A: #Helen likes STROOPWAFEL.

If instead the question is what Helen likes, the word "stroopwafel" will be the expression that resolves the issue. Thus, focus will belong on "stroopwafel" instead of "Helen".

1. Q: What does Helen like?
  A: #HELEN likes stroopwafel.
2. Q: What does Helen like?
  A: Helen likes STROOPWAFEL.

== Formal details ==
In the Roothian Squiggle Theory, $\sim$ is what requires a focused expression to have a suitable focus antecedent. In doing so, it also allows the focus denotation and the ordinary denotation to interact. In the alternative semantics approach to focus, each constituent $\alpha$ has both an ordinary denotation $[\![\alpha]\!]_o$ and a focus denotation $[\![\alpha]\!]_f$ which are composed by parallel computations. The ordinary denotation of $\alpha$ is simply whatever denotation it would have in a non-alternative-based system. The focus denotation of a constituent is typically the set of all ordinary denotations one could get by substituting a focused constituent for another expression of the same type.

1. Sentence: HELEN likes stroopwafel.
2. Ordinary denotation:
  $$[\![ \text{HELEN likes stroopwafel} ]\!]_o = \lambda w \, . \text{ Helen likes stroopwafel in } w$$
3. Focus denotation:
  $$[\![ \text{HELEN likes stroopwafel} ]\!]_f = \{ \lambda w \, . x \text{ likes stroopwafel in } w \, | \, x \in \mathcal{D}_e \}$$
1. Sentence: Helen likes STROOPWAFEL.
2. Ordinary denotation:
  $$[\![ \text{Helen likes STROOPWAFEL} ]\!]_o = \lambda w \, . \text{ Helen likes stroopwafel in } w$$
3. Focus denotation:
  $$[\![ \text{Helen likes STROOPWAFEL} ]\!]_f = \{ \lambda w \, . \text{ Helen likes } x \text{ in } w \, | \, x \in \mathcal{D}_e \}$$

The squiggle operator takes two arguments, a contextually provided antecedent $C$ and an overt argument $\alpha$. In the above examples, $C$ is a variable which can be valued as $\alpha$'s focus antecedent, while $\alpha$ itself could be the constituent [HELEN likes stroopwafel].

On one common definition, $\sim$ introduces a presupposition that $C$'s ordinary denotation is either a subset or an element of $\alpha$'s focus denotation, or in other words that either $[\![ C ]\!]_o \subseteq [\![ \alpha ]\!]_f$ or $[\![ C ]\!]_o \in [\![ \alpha ]\!]_f$. If this presupposition is satisfied, $\sim$ passes along its overt argument's ordinary denotation while "resetting" its focus denotation. In other words, when the presupposition is satisfied, $[\![ \alpha \sim C ]\!]_o = [\![ \alpha ]\!]_o$ and $[\![ \alpha \sim C ]\!]_f = \{ [\![ \alpha ]\!]_o \}$.

== See also ==
- Alternative semantics
- Focus (linguistics)
- Givenness
- Question
