= Charlene J. Sato =

American linguist

Charlene J. Sato or Charlene Junko Sato, called "Charlie" (25 June 1951, in Lahaina – 28 January 1996), was a linguist known for her contributions to pidgin and creole studies.

== Life ==
Sato grew up in Wahiawa and attended Leilehua High School. She was married at the time of her death. Sato died of ovarian cancer.

== Education ==
Sato obtained a B.A. in linguistics at University of California, Berkeley in 1973, and an M.A. in linguistics at University of Hawaiʻi in 1978. She then completed a Ph.D. in Applied Linguistics at University of California, Los Angeles in 1985.

== Career ==
Sato was a professor in the department of English as a Second Language at the University of Hawaiʻi for 14 years starting in 1982. Sato was the editor of the Carrier Pidgin newsletter from 1989 to 1993. She also served on the executive committee of the Society of Pidgin and Creole Linguistics.

== Activism ==
Sato worked to elevate the status of Hawaii Creole English, her native language. She also advocated for speakers of Hawaii English.

In 1987 Sato served as an expert witness in the case of Kahakua et al. v. Hallgren, in which two English-speaking plaintiffs from Hawaii sued the U.S. National Weather Service for discrimination in hiring. Sato demonstrated through phonetic analysis that the plaintiffs' speech was intelligible to mainland American English speakers, which supported the case that the plaintiffs had been discriminated against rather than being unqualified for the positions they applied for. Despite Sato's efforts, the judge ruled that discrimination had not taken place, and suggested that the plaintiffs should learn to speak differently.

Also in 1987, Sato fought the Hawaii State Board of Education's attempt to ban the use of Hawaii Creole English in the classroom, and helped establish the Hawaii Coordinating Council on Language Policy and Planning.

Sato was a member of the Industrial Workers of the World.

== Publications ==
Sato, Charlene J. 1990. The Syntax of Conversation in Interlanguage Development. Doctoral dissertation.
