= Focus (linguistics) =

Grammatical category for new or contrastive information

In linguistics, focus (abbreviated foc) is a grammatical category that conveys the part of the sentence that contributes new, non-derivable, or contrastive information. In the English sentence "Mary only insulted BILL", focus is expressed prosodically by a pitch accent on "Bill", which identifies him as the only person whom Mary insulted. By contrast, in the sentence "Mary only INSULTED Bill", the verb "insult" is focused and thus expresses that Mary performed no other actions towards Bill. Focus is a cross-linguistic phenomenon and a major field of study in linguistics. Research on focus spans numerous subfields including phonetics, syntax, semantics, pragmatics, and sociolinguistics.

== Functional approaches ==
Information structure has been described at length by a number of linguists as a grammatical phenomenon. Lexicogrammatical structures that code prominence, or focus, of some information over other information has a particularly significant history dating back to the 19th century. Recent attempts to explain focus phenomena in terms of discourse function, including those by Knud Lambrecht and Talmy Givón, often connect focus with the packaging of new, old, and contrasting information. Lambrecht in particular distinguishes three main types of focus constructions: predicate-focus structure, argument-focus structure, and sentence-focus structure. Focus has also been linked to other more general cognitive processes, including attention orientation.

In such approaches, contrastive focus is understood as the coding of information that is contrary to the presuppositions of the interlocutor. The topic–comment model distinguishes between the topic (theme) and what is being said about that topic (the comment, rheme, or focus).

== Formalist approaches ==
Standard formalist approaches to grammar argue that phonology and semantics cannot exchange information directly (See Fig. 1). Therefore, syntactic mechanisms, including features and transformations, include prosodic information regarding focus that is passed to the semantics and phonology.

Fig. 1 The Y-Model of Syntax, Semantics and Phonology

Focus may be highlighted prosodically, syntactically or both, depending on the language. In syntax, this can be shown by assigning focus markers, as shown in (1), or by preposing as shown in (2):

(1) I saw [JOHN] _{f}.
(2) [JOHN] _{f}, I saw.

In (1), focus is marked syntactically with the subscripted ‘f’, which is realized phonologically by a nuclear pitch accent. Clefting induces an obligatory intonation break. Therefore, in (2), focus is marked via word order and a nuclear pitch accent.

In English, focus also relates to phonology and has ramifications for how and where suprasegmental information, such as rhythm, stress, and intonation, is encoded in the grammar, and in particular intonational tunes that mark focus. Speakers can use pitch accents on syllables to indicate what word(s) are in focus. New words are often accented while given words are not. The accented word(s) forms the focus domain. However, not all of the words in a focus domain need be accented. (See for rules on accent placement and focus-marking). The focus domain can be either broad, as shown in (3), or narrow, as shown in (4) and (5):

(3) Did you see a grey dog or a cat? I saw [a grey DOG] _{f}.
(4) Did you see a grey dog or a grey cat? I saw a grey [DOG] _{f}.
(5) Did you see a grey dog or a black dog? I saw a [GREY] _{f} dog.

The question/answer paradigm shown in (3)–(5) has been utilized by a variety of theorists to illustrate the range of contexts where a sentence containing focus can be used felicitously. Specifically, the question/answer paradigm has been used as a diagnostic for what counts as new information. For example, the focus pattern in (3) would be infelicitous if the question was ‘Did you see a grey dog or a black dog?’.

In (3) and (4), the pitch accent is marked in bold. In (3), the pitch accent is placed on dog but the entire noun phrase a grey dog is under focus. In (4), the pitch accent is also placed on dog but only the noun dog is under focus. In (5), pitch accent is placed on grey and only the adjective grey is under focus.

Historically, generative proposals made focus a feature bound to a single word within a sentence. Noam Chomsky and Morris Halle formulated a Nuclear Stress Rule that proposed there to be a relation between the main stress of a sentence and a single constituent. Since this constituent is prominent sententially in a way that can contrast with lexical stress, this was originally referred to as "nuclear" stress. The purpose of this rule was to capture the intuition that, within each sentence, there is one word in particular that is accented more prominently because of its importance, which is said to form the nucleus of that sentence.

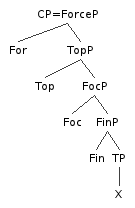
Left periphery structure, according to Rizzi (1997)

Focus was later suggested to be a structural position at the beginning of the sentence (or on the left periphery) in Romance languages such as Italian, as the lexical head of a Focus Phrase (or FP, following the X-bar theory of phrase structure). Jackendoff, Selkirk, Rooth, Krifka, Schwarzschild argue that focus consists of a feature that is assigned to a node in the syntactic representation of a sentence. Because focus is now widely seen as corresponding between heavy stress, or nuclear pitch accent, this feature is often associated with the phonologically prominent element(s) of a sentence.

Sound structure (phonological and phonetic) studies of focus are not as numerous, as relational language phenomena tend to be of greater interest to syntacticians and semanticists. However, that may be changing since a recent study found that focused words and phrases have a higher range of pitch compared to words in the same sentence, that words after the focus in both American English and Mandarin Chinese are lower than normal in pitch, and that words before a focus are unaffected. The precise usages of focus in natural language are still uncertain. A continuum of possibilities could possibly be defined between precisely enunciated and staccato styles of speech based on variations in pragmatics or timing.

Currently, there are two central themes in research on focus in generative linguistics. First, given what words or expressions are prominent, what is the meaning of some sentence? Rooth, Jacobs, Krifka, and von Stechow claim that there are lexical items and construction specific-rules that refer directly to the notion of focus. Dryer, Kadmon, Marti, Roberts, Schwarzschild, Vallduvi, and Williams argue for accounts in which general principles of discourse explain focus sensitivity. Second, given the meaning and syntax of some sentence, what words or expressions are prominent?

=== Prominence and meaning ===
Focus directly affects the semantics, or meaning, of a sentence. Different ways of pronouncing the sentence affects the meaning or what the speaker intends to convey. Focus distinguishes one interpretation of a sentence from other interpretations of the same sentence that do not differ in word order but may differ in the way in which the words are taken to relate to one another. To see the effects of focus on meaning, consider the following examples:

(6) John only introduced Bill to SUE.

In (6), accent is placed on Sue. There are two readings of (6) – broad focus shown in (7) and narrow focus shown in (8):

(7) John only [introduced Bill to SUE] _{f}.
(8) John only introduced Bill to [SUE] _{f}.

The meaning of (7) can be summarized as the only thing John did was introduce Bill to Sue. The meaning of (8) can be summarized as the only person to whom John introduced Bill is Sue.

In both (7) and (8), focus is associated with the focus sensitive expression only. This is known as association with focus. The class of focus sensitive expressions which focus can be associated with includes exclusives (only, just) non-scalar additives (merely, too) scalar additives (also, even), particularizers (in particular, for example), intensifiers, quantificational adverbs, quantificational determiners, sentential connectives, emotives, counterfactuals, superlatives, negation and generics. It is claimed that focus operators must c-command their focus.

==== Alternative semantics ====
In the alternative semantics approach to focus pioneered by Mats Rooth, each constituent $\alpha$ has both an ordinary denotation $[\![\alpha]\!]_o$ and a focus denotation $[\![\alpha]\!]_f$ which are composed by parallel computations. The ordinary denotation of a sentence is simply whatever denotation it would have in a non-alternative-based system, and its focus denotation can be thought of as the set containing all ordinary denotations one could get by substituting the focused constituent for another expression of the same semantic type.

For a sentence such as (9), the ordinary denotation will be the proposition that is true iff Mary likes Sue. Its focus denotation will be the set of each propositions such that for some contextually relevant individual 'x', that proposition is true iff Mary likes 'x'.

(9) Mary likes [SUE]_{f}.

In formal terms, the ordinary denotation of (9) will be as shown below:

- $[\![\text{Mary likes SUE}]\!]_o = \textit{like}(\textit{Mary})(\textit{Sue})$.

Focus denotations are computed using the alternative sets provided by alternative semantics. In this system, most unfocused items denote the singleton set containing their ordinary denotations.

- $[\![\text{Mary}]\!]_f = \{Mary\}$
- $[\![\text{likes}]\!]_f = \{ \lambda x \, . \, \lambda y \, . \, likes(y)(x) \}$

Focused constituents denote the set of all (contextually relevant) semantic objects of the same type.

- $\{like(Mary)(y) |y \in E\}$, where E is the domain of entities or individuals.

In alternative semantics, the primary composition rule is Pointwise Functional Application. This rule can be thought of as analogous to the cross product.

- Pointwise Functional Application: If $\alpha$ is a constituent with daughters $\beta$ and $\gamma$ which are of type $\langle \sigma, \tau \rangle$ and $\sigma$ respectively, then $[\![\alpha]\!] = \{ f(x) | f \in [\![\beta]\!], x \in [\![\gamma]\!] \}$

Applying the rule to example (9) would give the following focus denotation if the only contextually relevant individuals are Sue, Bill, Lisa, and Mary

- $[\![\text{Mary likes SUE}]\!]_f = \{like(Mary)(Sue), \, like(Mary)(Bill), \, like(Mary)(Lisa), \, like(Mary)(Mary)\}$

The focus denotation can be "caught" by focus-sensitive expressions like "only" as well as other covert items such as the squiggle operator.

==== Structured meanings ====
Following Jacobs and Williams, Krifka argues differently. Krifka claims focus partitions the semantics into a background part and focus part, represented by the pair:

The syntactic/semantic tree of the sentence John only introduced [BILL] _{f} to [SUE] _{f}.

$$\langle B,F\rangle$$

The logical form of which represented in lambda calculus is:

$$\langle \lambda x.x, A\rangle$$

This pair is referred to as a structured meaning. Structured meanings allow for a compositional semantic approach to sentences that involve single or multiple foci. This approach follows Gottlob Frege's (1897) Principle of Compositionality: the meaning of a complex expression is determined by the meanings of its parts and the way in which those parts are combined into structured meanings. Krifka's structured meaning theory represents focus in a transparent and compositional fashion it encompasses sentences with more than one focus as well as sentences with a single focus. Krifka claims the advantages of structured meanings are twofold: 1) We can access the meaning of an item in focus directly, and 2) Rooth's alternative semantics can be derived from a structured meaning approach but not vice versa. To see Krifka's approach illustrated, consider the following examples of single focus shown in (10) and multiple foci shown in (11):

(10) John introduced Bill to [SUE] _{f}.
(11) John only introduced [BILL] _{f} to [SUE] _{f}.

Generally, the meaning of (10) can be summarized as John introduced Bill to Sue and no one else, and the meaning of (11) can be summarized as the only pair of persons such that John introduced the first to the second is Bill and Sue.

Specifically, the structured meaning of (10) is:

$\langle introd(j, b, x), s\rangle$ where introd is the denotation of introduce, j John, b Bill and s Sue.

The background part of the structured meaning is; introd (j, b, x); and the focus part is s.

Through a (modified) form of functional application (or beta reduction), the focus part of (10) and (11) is projected up through the syntax to the sentential level. Importantly, each intermediate level has distinct meaning.

=== Focus marking ===
It has been claimed that new information in the discourse is accented but not given information. Generally, the properties of new and given are referred to as a word's discourse status. Definitions of new and given vary. Halliday defines given as "anaphorically" recoverable, while new is defined to be "textually and situationally non-derivable information". To illustrate that point, consider the following discourse in (12) and (13):

(12) Why don't you have some French TOAST?
(13) I’ve forgotten how to MAKE French toast.

In (13), the verb make is not given by the sentence in (12). It is discourse new. Therefore, it is available for accentuation. However, toast in (13) is given in (12). Therefore, it is not available for accentuation. As previously mentioned, pitch accenting can relate to focus. Accented words are often said to be in focus or F-marked often represented by F-markers. The relationship between accent placement is mediated through the discourse status of particular syntactic nodes. The percolation of F-markings in a syntactic tree is sensitive to argument structure and head-phrase relations.

==== Selkirk and accent placement ====
Selkirk develops an explicit account of how F-marking propagates up syntactic trees. Accenting indicates F-marking. F-marking projects up a given syntactic tree such that both lexical items (terminal nodes) and phrasal levels (nonterminal nodes) can be F-marked. Specifically, a set of rules determines how and where F-marking occurs in the syntax. These rules are shown in (1) and (2):

(14) Basic Rule: An accented word is f-marked.
(15) Focus Projection:

a. F-marking the head of a phrase licenses F-marking of the phrase.
b. F-marking of the internal argument of a head licenses the F-marking of the head.
c. F-marking of the antecedent of a trace left by NP or wh-movement licenses F-marking of the trace.

To see how (14) and (15) apply, consider the following example:

Judy _{f} [adopted _{f} a parrot _{f}] _{f}] _{foc}

Because there is no rule in (14) or (15) that licenses F-marking to the direct object from any other node, the direct object parrot must be accented as indicated in bold. Rule (15b) allows F-marking to project from the direct object to the head verb adopted. Rule (15a) allows F-marking to project from the head verb to the VP adopted a parrot. Selkirk assumes the subject Judy is accented if F-marked as indicated in bold.

==== Schwarzschild and accent placement ====
Schwarzschild points out weaknesses in Selkirk's ability to predict accent placement based on facts about the discourse. Selkirk's theory says nothing about how accentuation arises in sentences with entirely old information. She does not fully articulate the notion of discourse status and its relation to accent marking. Schwarzschild differs from Selkirk in that he develops a more robust model of discourse status. Discourse status is determined via the entailments of the context. That is achieved through the definition in (16):

(16) Definition of given: An utterance of U counts as given if it has a salient antecedent A and

a. if U is type e, then A and U corefer;
b. otherwise: modulo $\exists$-type-shifting, A entails the existential F-closure of U.

The operation in (16b) can apply to any constituent. $\exists$-type-shifting "is a way of transforming syntactic constituents into full propositions so that it is possible to check whether they are entailed by the context". For example, the result of $\exists$-type-shifting the VP in (17) is (18):

(17) [hums a happy tune]
(18) $\exists$x[x hums a happy tune]

Note that (18) is a full proposition. The existential F-closure in (16b) refers to the operation of replacing the highest F-marked node with an existentially closed variable. The operation is shown in (19) and (20):

(19) $\exists$x[x hums [a happy _{f} tune _{f}] _{f}]
(20) $\exists$Y$\exists$x[x hums Y]

Given the discourse context in (21a) it is possible to determine the discourse status of any syntactic node in (21b):

(21)

a. Sean [hummed a happy tune] _{VP}
b. Angie [hummed [Chopin's Funeral March] _{f}] _{VP}

If the VP in (21a) is the salient antecedent for the VP in (21b), then the VP in (21b) counts as given. $\exists$-type-shifted VP in (21a) is shown in (22). The existential F-closure of the VP in (21b) is shown in (23):

(22) $\exists$x[x hums a happy tune]
(23) $\exists$Y$\exists$x[x hums Y]

(22) entails (23). Therefore, the VP of (21b) counts as given. Schwarzschild assumes an optimality theoretic grammar. Accent placement is determined by a set of violable, hierarchically ranked constraints as shown in (24):

(24)

a. GIVENness: A constituent that is not F-marked is given.
b. Foc: A Foc-marked phrase contains an accent
c. AvoidF: Do not F-mark
d. HeadArg: A head is less prominent than its internal argument.

The ranking Schwarzschild proposes is seen in (25):

(25) GIVENness, Foc >> AvoidF >> HeadArg

As seen, GIVENness relates F-marking to discourse status. Foc relates F-marking to accent placement. Foc simply requires that a constituent(s) of an F-marked phrase contain an accent. AvoidF states that less F-marking is preferable to more F-marking. HeadArg encodes the head-argument asymmetry into the grammar directly.

===== Responses =====
A 2006 paper by German et al. suggests that both Selkirk's and Schwarzschild's theory of accentuation and F-marking makes incorrect predictions. Consider the following context:

(26) Are the children playing their game?
(27) Paul took down their tent that they play their game in.

It has been noted that prepositions are intrinsically weak and do not readily take accent. However, both Selkirk and Schwarzschild predict that in the narrow focus context, an accent will occur at most on the preposition in (27) as shown in (28):

(28) Paul took down their tent that they [play their game [in _{f} t _{f}] _{foc}].

However, the production experiment reported in German et al. showed that subjects are more likely to accent verbs or nouns as opposed to prepositions in the narrow focused context, thus ruling out accent patterns shown in (28). German et al. argue for a stochastic constraint-based grammar similar to Anttila and Boersma that more fluidly accounts for how speakers accent words in discourse.

== See also ==
- Information structure
- Topic–comment
- Topic-prominent language
- Question under discussion
- Squiggle operator
