= Alternative semantics =

Framework in formal semantics and logic

Alternative semantics (or Hamblin semantics) is a framework in formal semantics and logic. In alternative semantics, expressions denote alternative sets, understood as sets of objects of the same semantic type. For instance, while the word "Lena" might denote Lena herself in a classical semantics, it would denote the singleton set containing Lena in alternative semantics. The framework was introduced by Charles Leonard Hamblin in 1973 as a way of extending Montague grammar to provide an analysis for questions. In this framework, a question denotes the set of its possible answers. Thus, if $P$ and $Q$ are propositions, then $\{P,Q\}$ is the denotation of the question whether $P$ or $Q$ is true. Since the 1970s, it has been extended and adapted to analyze phenomena including focus, scope, disjunction, NPIs, presupposition, and implicature.

== See also ==
- Montague grammar – Approach to natural language semantics
- Question – Request for information
- Squiggle operator – Linguistic formalism
- Inquisitive semantics – Framework in logic and natural language semantics
- Free choice inference – Phenomenon in natural language
