= Question =

Request for information

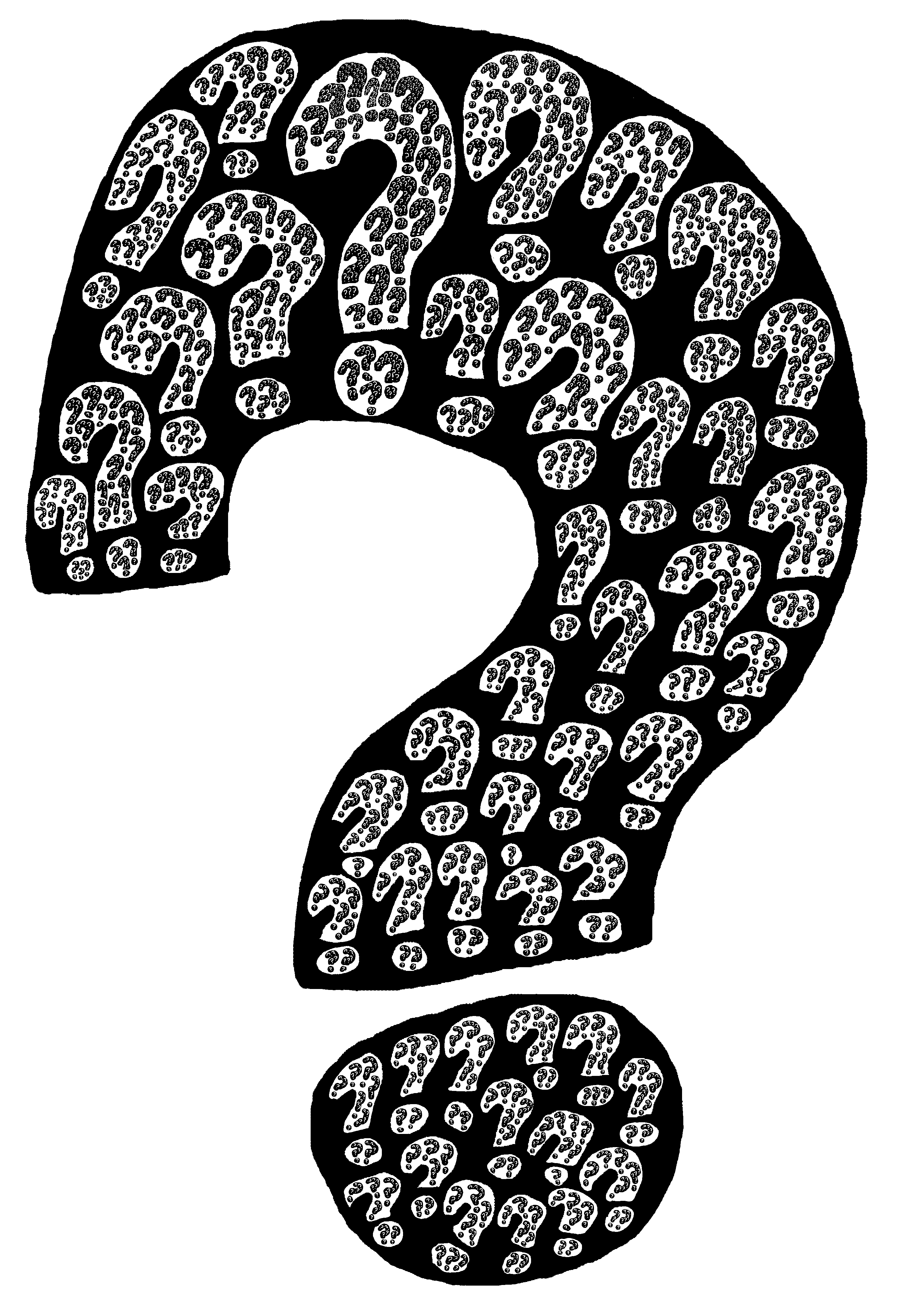
A question mark made of smaller question marks made of smaller question marks made of smaller question marks

A question is an utterance which serves as a request for information. Questions are sometimes distinguished from interrogatives, which are the grammatical forms, typically used to express them. Rhetorical questions, for instance, are interrogative in form but may not be considered bona fide questions, as they are not expected to be answered.

Questions come in a number of varieties. For instance, polar questions are those such as the English example "Is this a polar question?", which can be answered with "yes" or "no". Alternative questions such as "Is this a polar question, or an alternative question?" present a list of possibilities to choose from. Open questions such as "What kind of question is this?" allow many possible resolutions.

Questions are widely studied in linguistics and philosophy of language. In the subfield of pragmatics, questions are regarded as illocutionary acts which raise an issue to be resolved in discourse. In approaches to formal semantics such as alternative semantics or inquisitive semantics, questions are regarded as the denotations of interrogatives, and are typically identified as sets of the propositions which answer them.

== Definitions ==
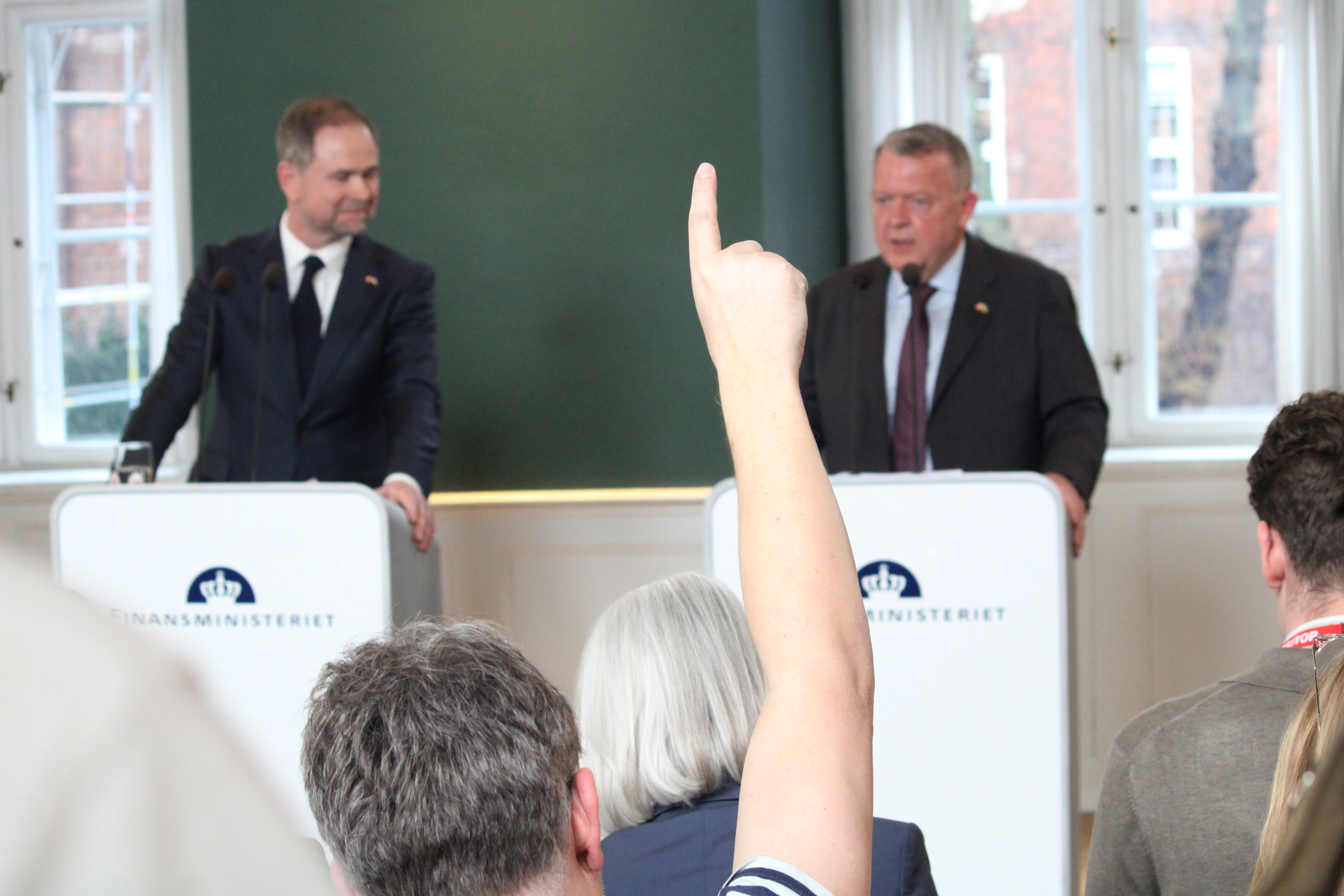
Finger in the air

Linguistically, a question may be defined on three levels.

At the level of semantics, a question is defined by its ability to establish a set of logically possible answers.

At the level of pragmatics, a question is an illocutionary category of speech act which seeks to obtain information from the addressee.

At the level of syntax, the interrogative is a type of clause which is characteristically associated with questions, and defined by certain grammatical rules (such as subject–auxiliary inversion in English) which vary by language.

Some authors conflate these definitions. While prototypical questions (such as "What is your name?") will satisfy all three definitions, their overlap is not complete. For example "I would like to know your name." satisfies the pragmatic definition, but not the semantic or syntactic ones. Such mismatches of form and function are called indirect speech acts.

== Uses ==
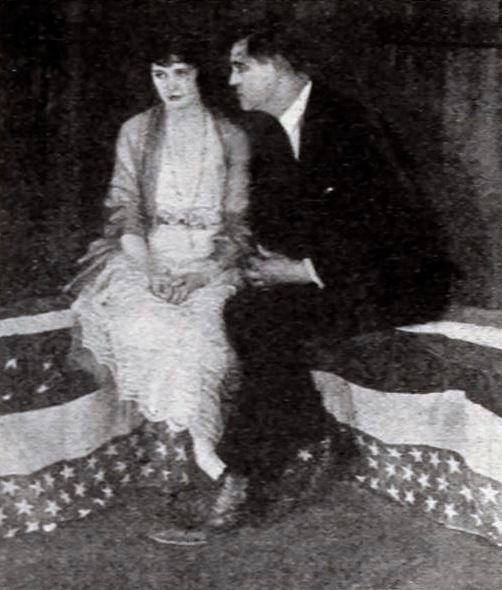
A man asking a woman a question

The principal use of questions is to elicit information from the person being addressed by indicating the information which the speaker (or writer) desires.

A slight variant is the display question, where the addressee is asked to produce information which is already known to the speaker. For example, a teacher or game show host might ask "What is the capital of Australia?" to test the knowledge of a student or contestant.

A direction question is one that seeks an instruction rather than factual information. It differs from a typical ("information") question in that the characteristic response is a directive rather than a declarative statement. For example:

A: When should I open your gift?
B: Open it now.

Questions may also be used as the basis for a number of indirect speech acts. For example, the imperative sentence "Pass the salt." can be reformulated (somewhat more politely) as:

Would you pass the salt?

Which has the form of an interrogative, but the illocutionary force of a directive.

The term rhetorical question may be colloquially applied to a number of uses of questions where the speaker does not seek or expect an answer (perhaps because the answer is implied or obvious), such as:

Has he lost his mind?
Why have I brought you all here? Let me explain...
They're closed? But the website said it was open until 10 o'clock.

Loaded questions (a special case of complex questions), such as "Have you stopped beating your wife?" may be used as a joke or to embarrass an audience, because any answer a person could give would imply more information than he was willing to affirm.

== Semantic classification ==
The main semantic classification of questions is according to the set of logically possible answers that they admit. An open question, such as "What is your name?", allows indefinitely many possible answers. A closed question admits a finite number of possible answers. Closed questions may be further subdivided into yes–no questions (such as "Are you hungry?") and alternative questions (such as "Do you want jam or marmalade?").

The distinction between these classes tends to be grammaticalized. In English, open and closed interrogatives are distinct clause types characteristically associated with open and closed questions, respectively.

=== Yes–no questions ===
A yes–no question (also called a polar question, or general question) asks whether some statement is true. They can, in principle be answered by a "yes" or "no" (or similar words or expressions in other languages). Examples include "Do you take sugar?", "Should they be believed?" and "Will you come to the party tonight?"

=== Alternative questions ===
An alternative question presents two or more discrete choices as possible answers in an assumption that only one of them is true. For example:

Are you supporting England, Ireland or Wales?

The canonical expected answer to such a question would be either "England", "Ireland", or "Wales". Such an alternative question presupposes that the addressee supports one of these three teams. The addressee may cancel this presupposition with an answer like "None of them".

In English, alternative questions are not syntactically distinguished from yes–no questions. Depending on context, the same question may have either interpretation:

- Do these muffins have butter or margarine? [I'm on a low fat diet.]
- Do these muffins have butter or margarine? [I saw that the recipe said you could use either.]

In speech, these are distinguishable by intonation, i.e., the question is interpreted as an alternative question when uttered with a rising contour on "butter" and a falling contour on "margarine".

=== Open questions ===
An open question (also called a variable question, open-ended question, non-polar question, or special question) admits indefinitely many possible answers. For example:

Where should we go for lunch?

In English, these are typically embodied in a closed interrogative clause, which uses an interrogative word such as when, who, or what. These are also called wh-words, and for this reason open questions may also be called wh-questions.

== Question formation ==
Questions may be marked by some combination of word order, morphology, interrogative words, and intonation. Where languages have one or more clause type characteristically used to form questions, they are called interrogative clauses. Open and closed questions are generally distinguished grammatically, with the former identified by the use of interrogative words.

In English, German, French and various other (mostly European) languages, both forms of interrogative are subject to an inversion of word order between verb and subject. In English, the inversion is limited to auxiliary verbs, which sometimes necessitates the addition of the auxiliary do, as in:

a. Sam reads the newspaper. – Statement
b. Does Sam read the newspaper? – Yes–no question formed using inversion and do-support

=== Open questions ===
Open questions are formed by the use of interrogative words such as, in English, when, what, or which. These stand in as variables representing the unknown information being sought. They may also combine with other words to form interrogative phrases, such as which shoes in:

Which shoes should I wear to the party?

In many languages, including English and most other European languages, the interrogative phrase must (with certain exceptions such as echo questions) appear at the beginning of the sentence, a phenomenon known as wh-fronting. In other languages, the interrogative appears in the same position as it would in a corresponding declarative sentence (in situ).

A question may include multiple variables as in:

Whose gifts are in which boxes?

=== Polar questions ===
Different languages may use different mechanisms to distinguish polar ("yes-no") questions from declarative statements (in addition to the question mark). English is one of a small number of languages which use word order. Another example is French:

	French	Translation
Declarative	Vous avez tué un oiseau.	You have killed a bird.
Polar question	Avez-vous tué un oiseau?	Have you killed a bird?

Cross-linguistically, the most common method of marking a polar question is with an interrogative particle, such as the Japanese か ka, Mandarin 吗 ma and Polish czy.

Other languages use verbal morphology, such as the -n verbal postfix in the Tunica language.

Of the languages examined in the World Atlas of Language Structures, only one, Atatláhuca–San Miguel Mixtec, was found to have no distinction between declaratives and polar questions.

==== Intonation ====
Most languages have an intonational pattern which is characteristic of questions (often involving a raised pitch at the end, as in English).

In some languages, such as English, or Russian, a rising declarative is a sentence which is syntactically declarative but is understood as a question by the use of a rising intonation. For example, "You're not using this?"

On the other hand, there are English dialects (Southern Californian English, New Zealand English) in which rising declaratives (the "uptalk") do not constitute questions. However it is established that in English there is a distinction between assertive rising declaratives and inquisitive rising declaratives, distinguished by their prosody.

==== Request for confirmation and speaker presupposition ====
Questions may be phrased as a request for confirmation for a statement the interrogator already believes to be true.

A tag question is a polar question formed by the addition of an interrogative fragment (the "tag") to a (typically declarative) clause. For example:

You're John, aren't you?
Let's have a drink, shall we?
You remembered the eggs, right?

This form may incorporate speaker's presupposition when it constitutes a complex question. Consider a statement

(A) Somebody killed the cat

and several questions related to it.

(B) John killed the cat, did he? (tag question)
(C) Was it John who killed the cat?

As compared with:

(D) Who killed the cat?

Unlike (B), questions (C) and (D) incorporate a presupposition that somebody killed the cat.

Question (C) indicates speaker's commitment to the truth of the statement that somebody killed the cat, but no commitment as to whether John did it or did not.

=== Punctuation ===
In languages written in Latin, Cyrillic or certain other scripts, a question mark at the end of a sentence identifies questions in writing. As with intonation, this feature is not restricted to sentences having the grammatical form of questions – it may also indicate a sentence's pragmatic function.

In Spanish an additional inverted mark is placed at the beginning: ¿Cómo está usted? "How are you?". An uncommon variant of the question mark is the interrobang (‽), which combines the function of the question mark and the exclamation mark.

== Responses and answers ==
The Cambridge Grammar of the English Language distinguishes between an answer (being a member of the set of logically possible answers, as delineated in § Semantic classification) and a response (any statement made by the addressee in reply to the question). For example, the following are all possible responses to the question "Is Alice ready to leave?"

i.  (a) Yes.
    (b) She's ready.
    (c) No, she's not.
ii. (a) I don't know.
    (b) Why do you ask?
    (c) She might be.
iii.(a) She's still looking for her wallet.
    (b) She wasn't expecting you before 5 o'clock.
    (c) I'll let you know when she's ready.

Only the [i] responses are answers in the Cambridge sense. The responses in [ii] avoid committing to a yes or no answer. The responses in [iii] all implicate an answer of no, but are not logically equivalent to no. (For example, in [iiib], the respondent can cancel the implicature by adding a statement like: "Fortunately, she packed everything up early.")

Along similar lines, Belnap and Steel (1976) define the concept of a direct answer:

A direct answer to a given question is a piece of language that completely, but just completely, answers the question...What is crucial is that it be effectively decidable whether a piece of language is a direct answer to a specific question... To each clear question there corresponds a set of statements which are directly responsive. ... A direct answer must provide an unarguably final resolution of the question.

=== Answering negative questions ===
"Negative questions" are interrogative sentences which contain negation in their phrasing, such as "Shouldn't you be working?" These can have different ways of expressing affirmation and denial from the standard form of question, and they can be confusing, since it is sometimes unclear whether the answer should be the opposite of the answer to the non-negated question. For example, if one does not have a passport, both "Do you have a passport?" and "Don't you have a passport?" are properly answered with "No", despite apparently asking opposite questions. The Japanese and Korean languages avoid this ambiguity. Answering "No" to the second of these in Japanese or Korean would mean, "I do have a passport".

A similar ambiguous question in English is "Do you mind if...?" The responder may reply unambiguously "Yes, I do mind," if they do mind, or "No, I don't mind," if they do not, but a simple "No" or "Yes" answer can lead to confusion, as a single "No" can seem like a "Yes, I do mind" (as in "No, please don't do that"), and a "Yes" can seem like a "No, I don't mind" (as in "Yes, go ahead"). An easy way to bypass this confusion would be to ask a non-negative question, such as "Is it all right with you if...?"

Some languages have different particles (for example the French "si", the German "doch" or the Swedish, Danish, and Norwegian "jo") to answer negative questions (or negative statements) in an affirmative way; they provide a means to express contradiction.

== Indirect questions ==
As well as direct questions (such as Where are my keys?), there also exist indirect questions (also called interrogative content clauses), such as where my keys are. These are used as subordinate clauses in sentences such as "I wonder where my keys are" and "Ask him where my keys are." Indirect questions do not necessarily follow the same rules of grammar as direct questions. For example, in English and some other languages, indirect questions are formed without inversion of subject and verb (compare the word order in "where are they?" and "(I wonder) where they are"). Indirect questions may also be subject to the changes of tense and other changes that apply generally to indirect speech.

== Learning ==
Questions are used from the most elementary stage of learning to original research. In the scientific method, a question often forms the basis of the investigation and can be considered a transition between the observation and hypothesis stages. Students of all ages use questions in their learning of topics, and the skill of having learners creating "investigatable" questions is a central part of inquiry education. The Socratic method of questioning student responses may be used by a teacher to lead the student towards the truth without direct instruction, and also helps students to form logical conclusions.

A widespread and accepted use of questions in an educational context is the assessment of students' knowledge through exams.

== Origins ==
Enculturated apes Kanzi, Washoe, Sarah and a few others who underwent extensive language training programs (with the use of gestures and other visual forms of communications) successfully learned to answer quite complex questions and requests (including question words "who", "what", "where"), although so far they have failed to learn how to ask questions themselves. For example, David and Anne Premack wrote: "Though she [Sarah] understood the question, she did not herself ask any questions – unlike the child who asks interminable questions, such as What that? Who making noise? When Daddy come home? Me go Granny's house? Where puppy? Sarah never delayed the departure of her trainer after her lessons by asking where the trainer was going, when she was returning, or anything else". The ability to ask questions is often assessed in relation to comprehension of syntactic structures. It is widely accepted that the first questions are asked by humans during their early infancy, at the pre-syntactic, one word stage of language development, with the use of question intonation.

== See also ==
- Curiosity
- Erotetics, the logic of questions and answers
- Inquiry
- Interrogation
- Interrogative word
- Inquisitive semantics
- Leading question
- Question under discussion
- Sentence function
- Squiggle operator
- Confusion
- Who Asked the First Question?, a book
