= Inquisitive semantics =

Framework in logic and natural language semantics

Inquisitive semantics is a framework in logic and natural language semantics. In inquisitive semantics, the semantic content of a sentence captures both the information that the sentence conveys and the issue that it raises. The framework provides a foundation for the linguistic analysis of statements and questions. It was originally developed by Ivano Ciardelli, Jeroen Groenendijk, Salvador Mascarenhas, and Floris Roelofsen.

== Basic notions ==
The essential notion in inquisitive semantics is that of an inquisitive proposition.

- An information state (alternately a classical proposition) is a set of possible worlds.
- An inquisitive proposition is a nonempty downward-closed set of information states.

Inquisitive propositions encode informational content via the region of logical space that their information states cover. For instance, the inquisitive proposition $\{ \{ w \}, \emptyset \}$ encodes the information that {w} is the actual world. The inquisitive proposition $\{ \{ w \}, \{ v \}, \emptyset \}$ encodes that the actual world is either $w$ or $v$.

An inquisitive proposition encodes inquisitive content via its maximal elements, known as alternatives. For instance, the inquisitive proposition $\{ \{ w \}, \{ v \}, \emptyset \}$ has two alternatives, namely $\{ w \}$ and $\{ v \}$. Thus, it raises the issue of whether the actual world is $w$ or $v$ while conveying the information that it must be one or the other. The inquisitive proposition $\{ \{w,v\}, \{ w \}, \{ v \}, \emptyset \}$ encodes the same information but does not raise an issue since it contains only one alternative.

The informational content of an inquisitive proposition can be isolated by pooling its constituent information states as shown below.

- The informational content of an inquisitive proposition P is $\operatorname{info}(P) = \{w \mid w \in t \text{ for some } t\in P\}$.

Inquisitive propositions can be used to provide a semantics for the connectives of propositional logic since they form a Heyting algebra when ordered by the subset relation. For instance, for every proposition P there exists a relative pseudocomplement $P^*$, which amounts to $\{s \subseteq W \mid s \cap t = \emptyset \text{ for all } t \in P \}$. Similarly, any two propositions P and Q have a meet and a join, which amount to $P\cap Q$ and $P \cup Q$ respectively. Thus inquisitive propositions can be assigned to formulas of $\mathcal{L}$ as shown below.

Given a model $\mathfrak{M} = \langle W, V \rangle$ where W is a set of possible worlds and V is a valuation function:

1. $[\![p]\!] = \{s \subseteq W \mid \forall w \in s, V(w, p) = 1\}$
2. $[\![ \neg \varphi ]\!] = \{s \subseteq W \mid s \cap t = \emptyset \text{ for all } t \in [\![\varphi]\!] \}$
3. $[\![ \varphi \land \psi]\!] = [\![\varphi]\!] \cap [\![\psi]\!]$
4. $[\![ \varphi \lor \psi]\!] = [\![\varphi]\!] \cup [\![\psi]\!]$

The operators ! and ? are used as abbreviations in the manner shown below.

1. $!\varphi \equiv \neg \neg \varphi$
2. $?\varphi \equiv \varphi \lor \neg \varphi$

Conceptually, the !-operator can be thought of as cancelling the issues raised by whatever it applies to while leaving its informational content untouched. For any formula $\varphi$, the inquisitive proposition $[\![!\varphi]\!]$ expresses the same information as $[\![\varphi]\!]$, but it may differ in that it raises no nontrivial issues. For example, if $[\![\varphi]\!]$ is the inquisitive proposition P from a few paragraphs ago, then $[\![!\varphi]\!]$ is the inquisitive proposition Q.

The ?-operator trivializes the information expressed by whatever it applies to, while converting information states that would establish that its issues are unresolvable into states that resolve it. This is very abstract, so consider another example. Imagine that logical space consists of four possible worlds, w_{1}, w_{2}, w_{3}, and w_{4}, and consider a formula $\varphi$ such that $[\![\varphi]\!]$ contains {w_{1}}, {w_{2}}, and of course $\emptyset$. This proposition conveys that the actual world is either w_{1} or w_{2} and raises the issue of which of those worlds it actually is. Therefore, the issue it raises would not be resolved if we learned that the actual world is in the information state {w_{3}, w_{4}}. Rather, learning this would show that the issue raised by our toy proposition is unresolvable. As a result, the proposition $[\![?\varphi]\!]$ contains all the states of $[\![\varphi]\!]$, along with {w_{3}, w_{4}} and all of its subsets.

== See also ==
- Alternative semantics
- Disjunction
- Intermediate logic
- Question
- Responsive predicate
- Rising declarative
