= High rising terminal =

Intonation pattern in some varieties of English

Example of uptalk used for grounding: "I'm a transfer student, from EPCC". Here "EPCC" is a college that the speaker thinks the listener probably knows about, but she is seeking confirmation before continuing.

The high rising terminal (HRT), also known as rising inflection, upspeak, uptalk, or high rising intonation (HRI), is a feature of some variants of English where declarative sentences can end with a rising pitch similar to that typically found in yes/no questions. HRT has been claimed to be especially common among younger speakers and women, though its exact sociolinguistic implications are an ongoing subject of research.

== Intonational characteristics ==
Empirically, one report proposes that HRT in American English and Australian English is marked by a high tone (high pitch or high fundamental frequency) beginning on the final accented syllable near the end of the statement (the terminal), and continuing to increase in frequency (up to 40%) to the end of the intonational phrase. New research suggests that the actual rise can occur one or more syllables after the last accented syllable of the phrase, and its range is much more variable than previously thought.

== Usage ==
In the United States, the phenomenon of HRT may be fairly recent, but is an increasingly common characteristic of speech, especially among younger speakers. However, serious scientific and linguistic inquiry on this topic has a much more extensive history in linguistic journals from Australia, New Zealand, and Britain, where HRT seems to have been noted as early as World War II.

It has been noted in speech heard in areas of Canada, in Cape Town, the Falkland Islands, and in the United States, where it is often associated with a particular sociolect that originated among affluent teenage girls in southern California (see Valleyspeak and Valley girl). It was observed in Mississippi in 1963 (see "Twirling at Ole Miss" in Red-Dirt Marijuana and Other Tastes). Elsewhere in the United States, this tonal pattern is characteristic of the speech heard in parts of the rural upper Midwest that have come under the influence of Norwegian phonology through Norwegian migration to Minnesota and North Dakota.

Although it is characterized in Britain as "Australian question intonation" (AQI) and blamed on the popularity of Australian soap operas among teenagers, HRT is also a feature of several Hiberno-English dialects, especially mid-Ulster and Belfast English.

Research published in 1986, regarding vernacular speech in Sydney, suggested that high rising terminal was used more than twice as often by young people as by older people, and was more common among women than men. In other words, HRT was more common among women born between 1950 and 1970 than among men born before 1950. The same research (and other sources) also suggested that the practice often served to discourage interruption, by indicating that a speaker had not quite completed a particular statement.

High rising terminal also occurs in non-English languages, such as in Arabic (Iraqi Arabic, Egyptian Arabic and Lebanese Arabic), Amharic, Cham, Tuvaluan, French, and Dominican and other varieties of Spanish.

== Effects ==
Media in Australia, Britain, and the US have negatively portrayed the usage of HRT, claiming that its use exhibits a speaker's insecurities about the statement and undermines effective speaking. Time reports that it hampers job interviews. However, other research has suggested HRT can be an effective way for speakers to establish common ground, that this often involves breathy voice, and that its meaning is highly situational, derived from a "complex interaction of time, presupposition, and inference."

Recent evidence shows that leaders of the peer group are more likely to use HRT in their declaratives than the junior members of the particular peer group. According to University of Pennsylvania phonologist Mark Liberman, George W. Bush began to use HRT extensively in his speeches as his presidency continued. Linguist Robin Lakoff drew attention to the pattern in her book Language and Women's Place, which argued that women were socialized to talk in ways that lacked power, authority, and confidence. Rising intonation on declarative sentences was one of the features Lakoff included in her description of "women's language", a gendered speech style she believed reflected and reproduced its users' subordinate social status.

== Implications for gender ==
Because HRT has been popularized as "Valley Girl Speak", it has acquired an almost exclusively feminine gender connotation. Studies have confirmed that women use HRT more often than men. Linguist Thomas J. Linneman contends, "The more successful a man is, the less likely he is to use HRT; the more successful a woman is, the more likely she is to use uptalk." Though women appear to use HRT more often than men, the differences in frequency are not significant enough to brand HRT as an exclusively female speech pattern. Susan Miller, a vocal coach in Washington, D.C., insists that she receives both male and female clients with equal frequency—not because either gender is concerned that they sound too feminine, but that they sound too young.

Findings have thus been inconclusive regarding HRT as a gendered speech pattern, though the (partial) evidence that HRT is more common among women is consistent with the third principle of the gender paradox identified by sociolinguist William Labov, namely that "in linguistic change from below, women use higher frequencies of innovative forms more than men do." Viewing HRT as "change from below" also explains why it appears to be more common among young speakers.

There appears to be merit to the claim that gendered connotations of HRT give rise to difficulties for women in particular. Anne Charity Hudley, a linguist at Stanford University, suggests, "When certain linguistic traits are tied to women . . . they often will be assigned a negative attribute without any actual evidence." Negative associations with the speech pattern, in combination with gendered expectations, have contributed to an implication that for female speakers to be viewed as authoritative, they ought to sound more like men than women. These implications are perpetuated by various media, including the coverage of politics.

US Senator Kirsten Gillibrand, for example, has voiced her concern that traditionally feminine speech patterns do not allow a female speaker to be taken seriously. "To meet those standards," she says, "you have to speak less like a young girl and more like a young, aspiring professional . . . it's a choice every young woman is going to have to make about how she wants to be and how she wants to be received." Lydia Dallet of Business Insider affirms this concern.

== Origins ==
The origins of HRT remain uncertain. Anecdotal evidence places the conception of the American English variety on the West Coast—anywhere from Southern California to the Pacific Northwest. This in turn comes into prominence due to development of "Valleyspeak" popularized by the Frank Zappa song "Valley Girl" in the early 1980s.

With respect to the southern hemisphere, it has been suggested that the feature may have originated in New Zealand.

It is unclear whether the American English varieties and the Oceanic varieties had any influence on each other regarding the spread of HRT.

== See also ==
- Fad
- Gay male speech
- Rising declarative
- Sexy baby voice
- Vocal fry register
