= Rising declarative =

Utterance with declarative syntax and rising intonation

In linguistics, a rising declarative is an utterance which has the syntactic form of a declarative but the rising intonation typically associated with polar interrogatives.

1. Rising declarative: Justin Bieber wants to hang out with me?
2. Falling declarative: Justin Bieber wants to hang out with me.
3. Polar question: Does Justin Bieber want to hang out with me?

Research on rising declaratives has suggested that they fall into two categories, assertive rising declaratives and inquisitive rising declaratives. These categories are distinguished both by the particulars of their pitch contours and their conventional discourse effects. However, the distinction in pitch contour is not categorical, varying between speakers and overridable by context.

Assertive rising declaratives are characterized phonologically by a high pitch accent which rises to a high boundary tone, notated as H* H-H% in the ToBI system. Assertive rising declaratives are assertion-like in that they provide the addressee with information. However, they also convey that the speaker is uncertain about some aspect of how their utterance fits in the discourse. For instance, in the following example, B is understood as effectively asserting that they do indeed speak Ladino while conveying uncertainty about whether speaking Ladino counts as speaking Spanish.

1. A: Do you speak Spanish?
  B: I speak Ladino?

Inquisitive rising declaratives are characterized phonologically by a low pitch accent which rises to a high boundary tone, or L* H-H% in the ToBI system. Their discourse effects are similar to biased questions in that they seek information from the addressee while conveying that the speaker already have certain expectations. For instance, in the following example, B conveys incredulity at the notion that John has a sister and invites A to confirm it.

1. A: John went to pick up his sister.
  B: John has a sister??

There is no consensus on how rising declaratives come to have their observed discourse effects. Different researchers come to different conclusions about whether the two kinds of rising declaratives have the same semantic content, and some analyses cover only one or the other category. In work such as Jeong (2018), the two kinds of utterances are treated as having different semantic content, assertive rising declaratives having bona fide declarative denotations and inquisitive rising declaratives having bona fide interrogative denotations. In such accounts, their respective discourse effects arise from the interaction between these denotations and pragmatic reasoning or conventions of use.

However, other work has proposed unified accounts. For instance, Westera (2013) argues that rising intonation conveys that the speaker isn't sure whether their utterance is in accordance with Gricean Maxims. On this account, all rising declaratives have the same semantic content but end up with different discourse effects depending on which maxim the speaker worries they are violating. In the assertive example above, the maxim would be the Maxim of Relevance. In the inquisitive case above, it would be the Maxim of Quality.

== See also ==
- Conversational scoreboard
- Intonation (linguistics)
- Speech act
- Tag question
- Uptalk
