= English determiners =

Determiners in the English language

English determiners (also known as determinatives) are words – such as the, a, each, some, which, this, and numerals such as five – that are most commonly used with nouns to specify their referents. The determiners form a closed lexical category in English.

The syntactic role characteristically performed by determiners is known as the determinative function (see § Terminology). A determinative combines with a noun (or, more formally, a nominal; see English nouns § Internal structure) to form a noun phrase (NP). This function typically comes before any modifiers in the NP (e.g., some very pretty wool sweaters, not *very pretty some wool sweaters (Note: This article uses asterisks to indicate ungrammatical examples.)). The determinative function is typically obligatory in a singular, countable, common noun phrase (compare I have a new cat to *I have new cat).

Semantically, determiners are usually definite or indefinite (e.g., the cat versus a cat), and they often agree with the number of the head noun (e.g., a new cat but not *many new cat). Morphologically, they are usually simple and do not inflect.

The most common of these are the definite and indefinite articles, the and a(n). Other determiners in English include the demonstratives this and that, and the quantifiers (e.g., many, and none) as well as the numerals. Determiners also occasionally function as modifiers in noun phrases (e.g., the many changes), determiner phrases (e.g., many more) or in adjective or adverb phrases (e.g., not that big). They may appear on their own without a noun, similar to pronouns (e.g., I'll have some), but they are distinct from pronouns.

Some sources, e.g. Cambridge Dictionary, Longman Dictionary, Collins Dictionary, and Collins COBUILD English grammar distinguish between predeterminers and determiners. Following this distinction, determiners can't be used directly next to each other (not: the my or my the). However, it is possible to put a predeterminer before a determiner (e.g. all the).

== Terminology ==
Words and phrases can be categorized by both their syntactic category (Note: Including lexical category for words and phrasal category for phrases.) and their syntactic function. In the clause the dog bit the man, for example, the dog belongs to the syntactic category of noun phrase and performs the syntactic function of subject. The distinction between category and function is at the heart of a terminological issue surrounding the word determiner: various grammars have used the word to describe a category, a function, or both.

Some sources, such as A Comprehensive Grammar of the English Language, use determiner as a term for a category as defined above and determinative for the function that determiners and possessives typically perform in a noun phrase (see § Functions). Others, such as The Cambridge Grammar of the English Language (CGEL), make the opposite terminological choice. And still others (e.g., The Grammar Book) use determiner for both the category and the function. This article uses determiner for the category and determinative for the function in the noun phrase.

The lexical category determiner is the class of words described in this article. They head determiner phrases, which can realize the functions determinative, predeterminative, and modifier:

- determiner phrases as determinatives: the box, this hill
- determiner phrases as predeterminatives: all the time, both those cars
- determiner phrases as modifiers: these two images, clear enough

The syntactic function determinative is a function that specifies a noun phrase. That is, determinatives add abstract meanings to the noun phrase, such as definiteness, proximity, number, and the like. While the determinative function is typically realized by determiner phrases, they may also be realized by noun phrases and prepositional phrases:

- noun phrases as determinatives: my question, this size room
- prepositional phrases as determinatives: over twenty belts, up to a hundred people

This article is about determiners as a lexical category.

=== History ===
Traditional grammar has no concept to match determiners, which are instead classified as adjectives, articles, or pronouns. The articles and demonstratives have sometimes been seen as forming their own category, but are often classified as adjectives. Linguist and historian Peter Matthews observes that the assumption that determiners are distinct from adjectives is relatively new, "an innovation of … the early 1960s."

In 1892, prior to the emergence of the determiner category in English grammars, Leon Kellner, and later Jespersen, discussed the idea of "determination" of a noun:

In Old English the possessive pronoun, or, as the French say, "pronominal adjective," expresses only the conception of belonging and possession; it is a real adjective, and does not convey, as at present, the idea of determination. If, therefore, Old English authors want to make nouns preceded by possessive pronouns determinative, they add the definite article.

By 1924, Harold Palmer had proposed a part of speech called "Pronouns and Determinatives", effectively "group[ing] with the pronouns all determinative adjectives (e.g., article-like, demonstratives, possessives, numerals, etc.), [and] shortening the term to determinatives (the "déterminatifs" of the French grammarians)." Palmer separated this category from more prototypical adjectives (what he calls "qualificative adjectives") because, unlike prototypical adjectives, words in this category are not used predicatively, tend not to inflect for comparison, and tend not to be modified.

In 1933, Leonard Bloomfield introduced the term determiner used in this article, which appears to define a syntactic function performed by "limiting adjectives".

Our limiting adjectives fall into two sub-classes of determiners and numeratives … The determiners are defined by the fact that certain types of noun expressions (such as house or big house) are always accompanied by a determiner (as, this house, a big house).

Matthews argues that the next important contribution was by Ralph B. Long in 1961, though Matthews notes that Long's contribution is largely ignored in the bibliographies of later prominent grammars, including A Comprehensive Grammar of the English Language and CGEL. Matthews illustrates Long's analysis with the noun phrase this boy: "this is no longer, in [Long's] account, an adjective. It is instead a pronoun, of a class he called ‘determinative’, and it has the function of a ‘determinative modifier’." This analysis was developed in a 1962 grammar by Barbara M. H. Strang and in 1972 by Randolph Quirk and colleagues. In 1985, A Comprehensive Grammar of the English Language appears to have been the first work to explicitly conceive of determiner as a distinct lexical category.

==== Determiners as heads? ====
Until the late 1980s, linguists assumed that, in a phrase like the red ball, the head was the noun ball and that the was a dependent. But a student at MIT named Paul Abney proposed, in his PhD dissertation about English noun phrases (NPs) in 1987, that the head was not the noun ball but the determiner the, so that the red ball is a determiner phrase (DP). This has come to be known as the DP analysis or the DP hypothesis (see Determiner phrase), and as of 2008 it is the majority view in generative grammar, though it is rejected in other perspectives. Chomsky also rejects it.

A comparison of the structure of a box under the competing analyses
A tree diagram of the noun phrase a box with a DP in determinative function	A tree diagram of the determiner phrase a box under the DP analysis

== Determiners versus other lexical categories ==
=== Adjectives ===
The main similarity between adjectives and determiners is that they can both appear immediately before nouns (e.g., many/happy people).

The key difference between adjectives and determiners in English is that adjectives cannot function as determinatives. The determinative function is an element in NPs that is obligatory in most singular countable NPs and typically occurs before any modifiers (see § Functions). For example, *I live in small house is ungrammatical because small house is a singular countable NP lacking a determinative. The adjective small is a modifier, not a determinative. In contrast, if the adjective is replaced or preceded by a possessive NP (I live in my house) or a determiner (I live in that house), then it becomes grammatical because possessive NPs and determiners function as determinatives.

There are a variety of other differences between the categories. Determiners appear in partitive constructions, while adjectives do not (e.g., some of the people but not *happy of the people). Adjectives can function as a predicative complement in a verb phrase (e.g., that was lovely), but determiners typically cannot (e.g., *that was every). Adjectives are not typically definite or indefinite, while determiners are. Adjectives as modifiers in a noun phrase do not need to agree in number with a head noun (e.g., old book, old books) while some determiners do (e.g., this book, these books). Morphologically, adjectives often inflect for grade (e.g., big, bigger, biggest), while few determiners do. Finally, adjectives can typically form adverbs by adding -ly (e.g., cheap → cheaply), while determiners cannot.

The boundary between determiner and adjective is not always clear, however. In the case of the word many, for example, the distinction between determiner and adjective is fuzzy, and different linguists and grammarians have placed this term into different categories. The CGEL categorizes many as a determiner because it can appear in partitive constructions, as in many of them. Alternatively, Bas Aarts offers three reasons to support the analysis of many as an adjective. First, it can be modified by very (as in his very many sins), which is a characteristic typical of certain adjectives but not of determiners. Second, it can occur as a predicative complement: his sins are many. Third, many has a comparative and superlative form (more and most, respectively).

=== Pronouns ===
==== Possessive pronouns such as my and your ====
There is disagreement about whether possessive words such as my and your are determiners or not. For example, Collins COBUILD Grammar classifies them as determiners while CGEL classify them as pronouns and A Comprehensive Grammar of the English Language has them dually classified as determiners and as pronouns in determinative function.

The main reason for classifying these possessive words as determiners is that, like determiners, they usually function as determinative in an NP (e.g., my / the cat). Reasons for calling them pronouns and not determiners include that the pronouns typically inflect (e.g., I, me, my, mine, myself), while determiners typically allow no morphological change. Determiners also appear in partitive constructions, while pronouns do not (e.g., some of the people but not *my of the people). Also, some determiners can be modified by adverbs (e.g., very many), but this is not possible for pronouns.

==== We / us and you ====
The words you and we share features commonly associated with both determiners and pronouns in constructions such as we teachers do not get paid enough. On the one hand, the phrase-initial position of these words is a characteristic they share with determiners (compare the teachers). Furthermore, they cannot combine with more prototypical determiners (*the we teachers), which suggests that they fill the same role. These characteristics have led linguists and grammarians like Ray Jackendoff and Steven Paul Abney to categorize such uses of we and you as determiners.

On the other hand, these words can show case contrast (e.g., us teachers), a feature that, in Modern English, is typical of pronouns but not of determiners. Thus, Evelyne Delorme and Ray C. Dougherty treat words like us as pronouns in apposition with the noun phrases that follow them, an analysis that Merriam–Webster's Dictionary of English Usage also follows. Richard Hudson and Mariangela Spinillo also categorize these words as pronouns but without assuming an appositive relationship between the pronoun and the rest of the noun phrase.

=== Adverbs ===
There is disagreement about whether that is a determiner or a degree adverb in clauses like it is not that unusual. For example, A Comprehensive Grammar of the English Language categorizes this use of that as an adverb. This analysis is supported by the fact that other pre-head modifiers of adjectives that "intensify" their meaning tend to be adverbs, such as awfully in awfully sorry and too in too bright.

On the other hand, Aarts categorizes this word as a determiner, a categorization also used in CGEL. This analysis can be supported by expanding the determiner phrase: it is not all that unusual. All can function as a premodifier of determiners (e.g., all that cake) but not adjectives (e.g., *all unusual), which leads Aarts to suggest that that is a determiner.

=== Various quantificational expressions ===
Expressions with similar quantification meanings such as a lot of, lots of, plenty of, a great deal of, tons of, etc. are sometimes said to be determiners, while other grammars argue that they are not words, or even phrases. The non-determiner analysis is that they consist of the first part of a noun phrase. For example, a lot of work is a noun phrase with lot as its head. It has a preposition phrase complement beginning with the preposition of. In this view, they could be considered lexical units, but they are not syntactic constituents.

== The syntax of determiners and determiner phrases ==
For the sake of this section, Abney's DP hypothesis (see § History) is set aside. In other words, here a DP is taken to be a dependent in a noun phrase (NP) and not the other way around.

=== Internal structure ===
A determiner phrase (DP) is headed by a determiner and optionally takes dependents. DPs can take modifiers, which are usually adverb phrases (e.g., [almost no] people) or determiner phrases (e.g., [many more] people) . Comparative determiners like fewer or more can take than prepositional phrase (PP) complements (e.g., it weighs [less than five] grams). The following tree diagram in the style of CGEL shows the DP far fewer than twenty, with the adverb far as a modifier and the PP than twenty as a complement.

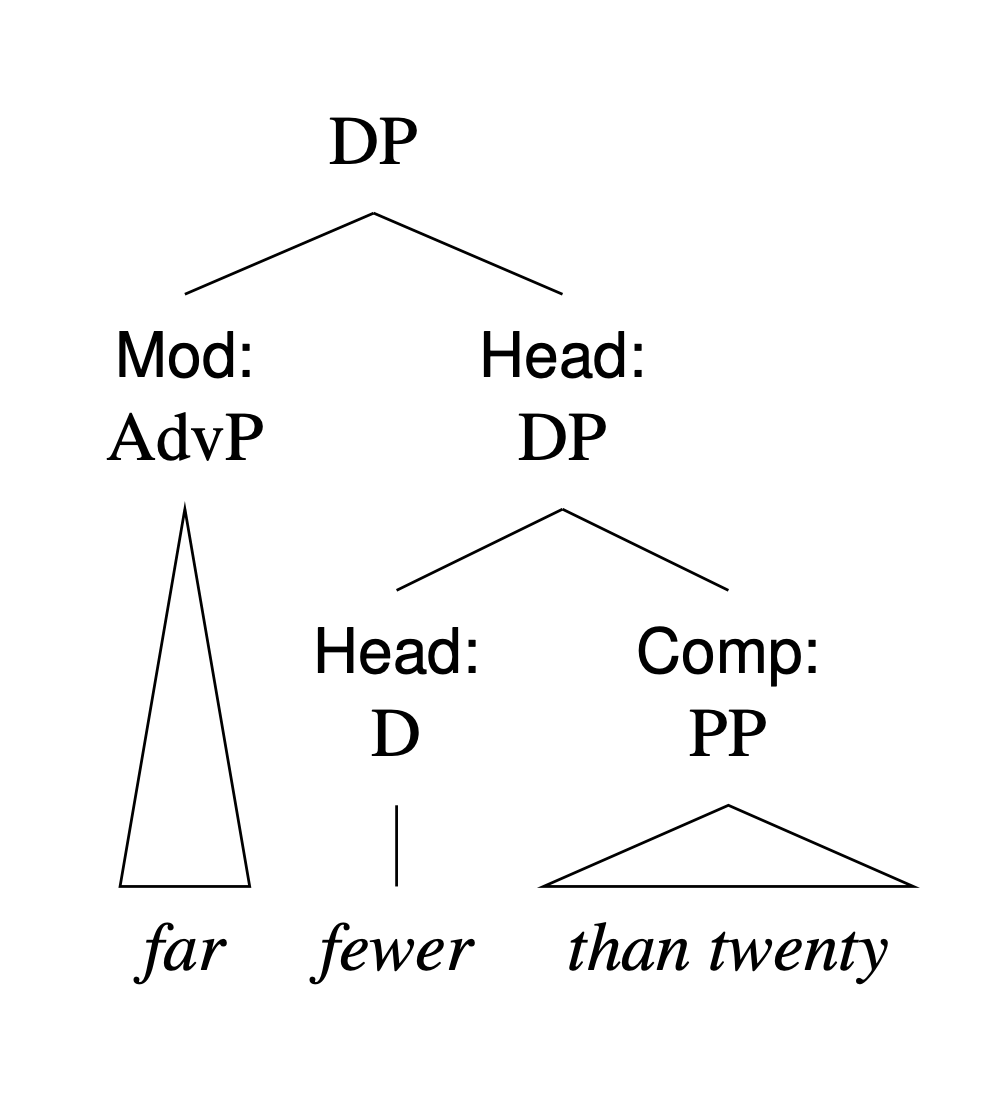

=== Functions ===
==== Determinative ====
As stated above, there is some terminological confusion about the terms "determiner" and "determinative". In this article, "determiner" is a lexical category while "determinative" is the function most typically performed by determiner phrases (in the same way that "adjective" denotes a category of words while "modifier" denotes the most typical function of adjective phrases). DPs are not the only phrases that can function as determinative, but they are the most common.

A determinative is a function only in noun phrases. It is usually the leftmost constituent in the phrase, appearing before any modifiers. A noun phrase may have many modifiers, but only one determinative is possible. In most cases, a singular, countable, common noun requires a determinative to form a noun phrase; plurals and uncountables do not. The determinative is underlined in the following examples:

- the box
- not very many boxes
- even the very best workmanship
- my uncle's house (the determinative is an NP, not a DP)
- what size shoes (the determinative is an NP, not a DP)

The most common function of a DP is determinative in an NP. This is shown in the following syntax tree in the style of CGEL. It features two determiner phrases, all in predeterminer modifier function (see § Predeterminative), and the in determinative function (labeled Det:DP).

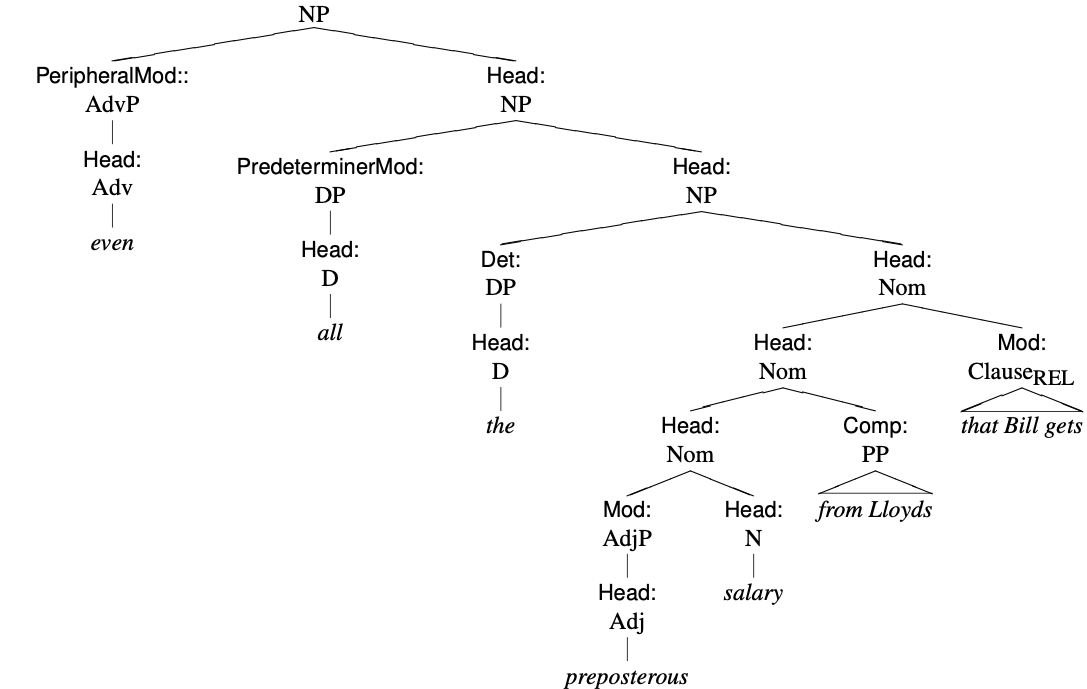

==== Predeterminative ====
If noun phrases can only contain one determinative, the following noun phrases present challenges:

- all the time
- both those cars

The determiner phrase the functions as the determinative in all the time, and those functions as the determinative in both those cars. But all and both also have specifying roles rather than modifying roles in the noun phrase, much like the determinatives do. To account for noun phrases like these, A Comprehensive Grammar of the English Language also recognizes the function of predeterminative (or predeterminer). Some linguists and grammarians offer different accounts of these constructions. CGEL, for instance, classifies them as a kind of modifier in noun phrases.

Predeterminatives are typically realized by determiner phrases (e.g., all in all the time). However, they can also be realized by noun phrases (e.g., one-fifth the size) and adverb phrases (e.g., thrice the rate).

==== Modifier ====
Determiner phrases can function as pre-head modifiers in noun phrases, such as the determiner phrase two in these two images. In this example, these functions as the determinative of the noun phrase, and two functions as a modifier of the head images. And they can function as pre-head modifiers in adjective phrases—[_{AdjP} [_{DP} the] more], [_{AdjP} [_{DP} the] merrier]—and adverb phrases—[_{AdvP} [_{DP} the] longer] this dish cooks, [_{AdvP} [_{DP} the] better] it tastes).

Determiner phrases can also function as post-head modifiers in these phrases. For example, the determiners each, enough, less, and more can function as post-head modifiers of noun phrases, as in the determiner phrase each in two seats each. Enough can fill the same role in adjective phrases (e.g., clear enough) and in adverb phrases (e.g., funnily enough).

DPs also function as modifiers in DPs (e.g., [not that many] people).

==== Fusion of functions ====
Determiners may bear two functions at one time. Usually this is a fusion of determinative and head in an NP where no head noun exists. In the clause many would disagree, the determiner many is the fused determinative-head in the NP that functions as the subject. In many grammars, both traditional and modern, and in almost all dictionaries, such words are considered to be pronouns rather than determiners.

== Types of determiners ==
Several words can belong to the same part of speech but still differ from each other to various extents, with similar words forming subclasses of the part of speech. For example, the articles a and the have more in common with each other than with the demonstratives this or that, but both belong to the class of determiner and, thus, share more characteristics with each other than with words from other parts of speech. Article and demonstrative, then, can be considered subclasses or types of determiners.

=== Morphological types ===
==== Compound determiners ====
Most determiners are very basic in their morphology, but some are compounds.A large group of these is formed with the words any, every, no, and some together with body, one, thing, or where (e.g., anybody, somewhere). The morphological phenomenon started in Old English, when thing, was combined with some, any, and no. In Middle English, it would combine with every.

The cardinal numbers greater than 99 are also compound determiners. This group also includes a few and a little, and Payne, Huddleston, and Pullum argue that once, twice, and thrice also belong here, and not in the adverb category.

==== Gradable determiners ====
Although most determiners do not inflect, the following determiners participate in the system of grade.

The inflectional paradigms of degree determiners
Plain	Comparative	Superlative
few	fewer	fewest
little	less	least
many	more	most
much	more	most

=== Syntactic and semantic types ===
The following types of determiners are organized, first, syntactically according to their typical position in a noun phrase in relation to each other and, then, according to their semantic contributions to the noun phrase. This first division, based on categorization from A Comprehensive Grammar of the English Language, includes three categories:

- Central determiners occur after any predeterminers and before any postdeterminers; they tend to function as determinatives regardless of the presence or absence of other determiners in the noun phrase.
- Predeterminers occur before any other determiner in the noun phrase and often function as a determinative when no other word is filling that role or as a predeterminative when the determinative role is already filled.
- Postdeterminers occur after all other determiners and often function as a determinative when no other word is filling that role or as a pre-head modifier of a noun phrase when the determinative role is filled.

The secondary divisions are based on the semantic contributions of the determiner to a noun phrase. The subclasses are named according to the labels assigned in CGEL and the Oxford Modern English Grammar, which use essentially the same labels.

==== Central determiners ====
===== Articles =====
According to CGEL, articles serve as "the most basic expression of definiteness and indefiniteness." That is, while other determiners express definiteness and other kinds of meaning, articles serve primarily as markers of definiteness. The articles are generally considered to be:

- the (definite)
- a(n) (indefinite)

Other articles have been posited, including unstressed some, a zero article (indefinite with mass and plural) and a null article (definite with singular proper nouns).

===== Demonstrative determiners =====
The two main demonstrative determiners are this and that. Their respective plural forms are these and those.

	singular	plural
proximal	this	these
distal	that	those

The demonstrative determiners mark noun phrases as definite. They also add meaning related to spatial deixis; that is, they indicate where the thing referenced by the noun is in relation to the speaker. The proximal this signals that the thing is relatively close to the speaker while the distal that signals that the thing is relatively far.

CGEL classifies the archaic and dialectal yonder (as in the noun phrase yonder hills) as a marginal demonstrative determiner. Yonder signals that the thing referenced by the noun is far from the speaker, typically farther than what that would signal. Thus, we would expect yonder hills to be farther from the speaker than those hills. Unlike the main demonstrative determiners, yonder does not inflect for number (compare yonder hill).

===== Distributive determiners =====
The following are the distributive determiners:

- each
- every

The distributive determiners mark noun phrases as indefinite. They also add distributive meaning; that is, "they pick out the members of a set singly, rather than considering them in mass." Because they signal this distributive meaning, these determiners select singular noun heads when functioning as determinatives in noun phrases (e.g., each student).

===== Existential determiners =====
The following are the existential determiners:

- any
- some

Existential determiners mark a noun phrase as indefinite. They also convey existential quantification, meaning that they assert the existence of a thing in a quantity greater than zero.

===== Disjunctive determiners =====
The following are the disjunctive determiners:

- either
- neither

Disjunctive determiners mark a noun phrase as definite. They also imply a single selection from a set of exactly two. Because they signal a single selection, disjunctive determiners select singular nouns when functioning as determinatives in noun phrases (e.g., either side). A Comprehensive Grammar of the English Language does not recognize this category and instead label either an "assertive determiner" and neither a "negative determiner."

===== Negative determiner =====
The negative determiner is no with its independent form none. Distinct dependent and independent forms are otherwise found only in possessive pronouns, where the dependent is only found with a subsequent noun and the independent without (e.g., my way and no way are dependent, while mine and none are independent).

No signifies that not one member of a set or sub-quantity of a quantity under consideration has a particular property. Neither also conveys this kind of meaning but is only used when selecting from a set of exactly two, which is why neither is typically classified as disjunctive rather than negative.

===== Additive determiner =====
The additive determiner is another. Another was formed from the compounding of the indefinite article an and the adjective other; thus, it marks a noun phrase as indefinite. It also conveys additive meaning. For example, another banana signals an additional banana in addition to some first banana. Another can also mark an alternative. For example, another banana can also signal a different banana, perhaps one that is riper. Because it can also convey this alternative meaning, another is sometimes labeled an alternative-additive determiner.

===== Sufficiency determiners =====
The following are the sufficiency determiners:

- enough
- sufficient

These determiners convey inexact quantification that is framed in terms of some minimum quantity needed. For instance, enough money for a taxi implies that a minimum amount of money is necessary to pay for a taxi and that the amount of money in question is sufficient for the purpose. When functioning as determinatives in a noun phrase, sufficiency determiners select plural count nouns (e.g., sufficient reasons) or non-count nouns (e.g., enough money).

===== Interrogative determiners =====
The following are the interrogative determiners:

- what
- which

These determiners can also be followed by -ever and -soever. Interrogative determiners are typically used in the formation of questions, as in what/which conductor do you like best? Using what marks a noun phrase as indefinite while using which marks the noun phrase as definite, being used when the context implies a limited number of choices.

===== Relative determiners =====
The following are the relative determiners:

- what
- which

These determiners can also be followed by -ever. Relative determiners typically function as determiners in noun phrases that introduce relative clauses, as in we can use whatever/whichever edition you want.

==== Predeterminers ====
===== Personal determiners =====
In grammars that consider them determiners rather than pronouns (see § Determiners versus other lexical categories), the personal determiners are the following:

- we
- you

Though these words are normally pronouns, in phrases like we teachers and you guys, they are sometimes classified as personal determiners. Personal determiners mark a noun phrase as definite. They also add meaning related to personal deixis; that is, they indicate whether the thing referenced by the noun includes the speaker (we/us) or at least one addressee and not the speaker (you). In some dialects such as the Ozark dialect, this usage extends to them as in them folks.

===== Universal determiners =====
The following are the universal determiners:

- all
- both

Universal determiners convey universal quantification, meaning that they assert that no subset of a thing exists that lacks the property that is described. For example, saying "all the vegetables are ripe" is the same as saying "no vegetables are not ripe." The primary difference between all and both is that both applies only to sets with exactly two members while all lacks this limitation. But CGEL notes that because of the possibility of using both instead, all "generally strongly implicates 'more than two.'"

==== Postdeterminers ====
===== Cardinal numerals =====
Cardinal numerals (zero, one, two, thirty-four, etc.) can represent any number. Therefore, the members of this subclass of determiner are infinite in quantity and cannot be listed in full.

Cardinal numerals are typically thought to express the exact number of the things represented by the noun, but this exactness is through implicature rather than necessity. In the clause five people complained, for example, the number of people complaining is usually thought to be exactly five. But technically, the proposition would still be true if additional people were complaining as well: if seven people were complaining, then it is also necessarily true that five people were complaining. General norms of cooperative conversation, however, make it such that cardinal numerals typically express the exact number (e.g., five = no more and no less than five) unless otherwise modified (e.g., at least five or at most five).

===== Positive paucal determiners =====
The following are the positive paucal determiners:

- a few
- a little
- certain
- several
- various

The positive paucal determiners convey a small, imprecise quantity—generally characterized as greater than two but smaller than whatever quantity is considered large. When functioning as determinatives in a noun phrase, most paucal determiners select plural count nouns (e.g., a few mistakes), but a little selects non-count nouns (e.g., a little money).

===== Degree determiners =====
In grammars that consider them determiners rather than adjectives (see § Determiners versus other lexical categories), the degree determiners are the following:

- few
- little
- many
- much

Degree determiners mark a noun phrase as indefinite. They also convey imprecise quantification, with many and much expressing a large quantity and few and little expressing a small quantity. Degree determiners are unusual in that they inflect for grade, a feature typical of adjectives and adverbs but not determiners. The comparative forms of few, little, many, and much are fewer, less, more, and more respectively. The superlative forms are fewest, least, most, and most respectively. The plain forms can be modified with adverbs, especially very, too and so (and not can also be added). Note that unmodified much is quite rarely used in affirmative statements in colloquial English.

== Semantics ==
The main semantic contributions of determiners are quantification and definiteness.

=== Quantification ===
Many determiners express quantification.

- Most obviously, cardinal numbers (zero, one, two, etc.) express quantification.
- The degree determiners much/many, little/few, and their comparative and superlative forms more, most, less/fewer, least/fewest all express quantification. Where two forms are given, the first is used with non-count nouns and the second with count nouns (although in colloquial English less and least are frequently also used with count nouns).
- The positive paucal determiners also express quantification. These are a few/a little, several, a couple of, a bit of, a number of etc.
- Finally, determiners expressing maximum, sufficient or zero quantity all express quantification. These are all, both, enough, sufficient, no.

=== Definiteness ===
From a semantic point of view, a definite NP is one that is identifiable and activated in the minds of the first person and the addressee. From a grammatical point of view in English, definiteness is typically marked by definite determiners, such as the, that, and this, all, every, both, etc. Linguists find it useful to make a distinction between the grammatical feature of definiteness and the cognitive feature of identifiability. This accounts for cases of form-meaning mismatch, where a definite determiner results in an indefinite NP, such as the example I met this guy from Heidelberg on the train, where the underlined NP is grammatically definite but semantically indefinite.

The majority of determiners, however, are indefinite. These include the indefinite article a, but also most quantifiers, including the cardinal numerals.

== Pragmatics ==
Choosing the definite article over no article in a pair like the Americans and Americans can have the pragmatic effect of depicting "the group as a monolith of which the speaker is not a part." Relatedly, the choice between this and that may have an evaluative purpose, where this suggest a closeness, and therefore a more positive evaluation.

== See also ==
- List of English determiners
- English pronouns
- Noun adjunct - a noun can be used as a modifier to specify a particular instance
