= Determiner (disambiguation) =

In linguistics, a determiner is a class of words that includes articles and other words that function in the place of articles.

Determiner may also refer to:

- Determiner (cuneiform), a symbol specifying that the associated word belongs to a particular semantic group
- Determiner phrase, a phrase starting with a determiner.
