= Form–meaning mismatch =

Mismatch between grammatical form and meaning

In linguistics, a form–meaning mismatch is a natural mismatch between the grammatical form and its expected meaning. Such form–meaning mismatches happen everywhere in language. Nevertheless, there is often an expectation of a one-to-one relationship between meaning and form, and indeed, many traditional definitions are based on such an assumption. For example:

Verbs come in three tenses: past, present, and future. The past is used to describe things that have already happened (e.g., earlier in the day, yesterday, last week, three years ago). The present tense is used to describe things that are happening right now, or things that are continuous. The future tense describes things that have yet to happen (e.g., later, tomorrow, next week, next year, three years from now).

While this accurately captures the typical behaviour of these three tenses, it's not unusual for a futurate meaning to have a present tense form (I'll see you before I go) or a past tense form (If you could help, that would be great).

== Types of mismatch ==
There are three types of mismatch:

1. Many forms correspond to one function/meaning
2. One form corresponds to many functions/meanings
3. The meaning cannot be derived from the forms

== Examples ==
=== Syncretism ===
Syncretism is "the relation between words which have different morphosyntactic features but are identical in form". For example, the English first person genitive pronouns are distinct for dependent my and independent mine, but for he, there is syncretism: the dependent and independent pronouns share the form his (e.g., that's his book; it's his). As a result, there is no consistent match between the form and function of the word. Similarly, Slovak nouns typically mark case as in the word for "dog", which is pes in nominative case but psa in accusative. But in slovo "word", the nominative and accusative have come to share the same form, which means that it does not reliably indicate whether it is a subject or an object.

=== Subject-agent mismatches ===
The subject of a sentence is often defined as a noun phrase that denotes the semantic agent or "the doer of the action". The Longman Dictionary defines subject as

a noun, noun phrase, or pronoun that usually comes before a main verb and represents the person or thing that performs the action of the verb, or about which something is stated.

But in many cases, the subject does not express the expected meaning of doer.

==== Dummy pronouns ====
Dummy there in there's a book on the table is the grammatical subject, but there isn't the doer of the action or the thing about which something is stated. In fact it has no semantic role at all. The same is true of it in it's cold today.

==== Raising objects ====
In the case of object raising, the object of one verb can be the agent of another verb. For example, in we expect JJ to arrive at 2:00, JJ is the object of expect, but JJ is also the person who will be doing the arriving. Similarly, in Japanese, the potential form of verbs can raise the object of the main verb to the subject position. For example, in the sentence 私は寿司が食べられる (Watashi wa sushi ga taberareru, "I can eat sushi"), 寿司 ("sushi") is the object of the verb 食べる ("eat") but functions as the subject of the potential form verb 食べられる ("be able to eat").

=== Definiteness ===
From a semantic point of view, a definite noun phrase is one that is identifiable and activated in the minds of the first person and the addressee. From a grammatical point of view in English, definiteness is typically marked by definite determiners, such as this. “The theoretical distinction between grammatical definiteness and cognitive identifiability has the advantage of enabling us to distinguish between a discrete (grammatical) and a non-discrete (cognitive) category.” So, in a case such as I met this guy from Heidleberg on the train, the underlined noun phrase is grammatically definite but semantically indefinite; there is a form–meaning mismatch.

=== Number agreement ===
Grammatical number is typically marked on nouns in English, and present-tense verbs show agreement with the subject. But there are cases of mismatch, such as with a singular collective noun as the subject and plural agreement on the verb (e.g., The team are working hard). The pronoun you also triggers plural agreement regardless of whether it refers to one person or more (e.g., You are the only one who can do this). This is similar to the use of honorific constructions in the Toda language, where subject–verb agreement for number is generally marked by different verb conjugations, but there are exceptions with certain honorific forms. For example, consider the following verb forms for the verb "to give" in Toda:

- kwēś- (non-honorific singular form)
- kwēśt- (non-honorific plural form)
- kwēśt- (honorific form, used for both singular and plural)

In the case of the honorific form kwēśt-, there is a form–meaning mismatch regarding number, as the same form is used to show respect to a single person or multiple people.

In some cases, the mismatch may be apparent rather than real due to a poorly chosen term. For example, "plural" in English suggest more than one, but "non-singular" may be a better term. We use plural marking for things less than one (e.g., 0.5 calories) or even for nothing at all (e.g., zero degrees).

=== Gender ===
In some cases, the grammatical gender of a word appears to be a mismatch with its meaning. For example, in German, das Fräulein means the unmarried woman. A woman is naturally feminine in terms of social gender, but the word here is neuter gender.

Also, in Chichewa, a Bantu language, the word for "child" is mwaná (class 1) in the singular and aná (class 2) in the plural. When referring to a group of mixed-gender children, the plural form, aná, is used even though it belongs to a different noun class from that of the singular form, mwaná.

=== Cross-linguistic example ===
German and English compounds are quite different syntactically, but not semantically.

== Effects ==
=== Language change ===
Form–meaning mismatches can lead to language change. An example of this is the split of the nominal gerund construction in English and a new “non-nominal” reference type becoming the most dominant function of the verbal gerund construction.

=== Language learning ===
The syntax–semantics interface is one of the most vulnerable aspects in L2 acquisition. Therefore, L2 speakers are found to either often have incomplete grammar, or have highly variable syntactic–semantic awareness and performance.

== Causes ==
In morphology, a morpheme can get trapped and eliminated. Consider this example: the Old Norwegian for "horse's" was hert-s, and the way to mark that as definite and genitive ("the" + GEN) was -in-s. When those went together, the genitive of hert-s was lost, and the result is hest-en-s ("the horse" + GEN) in modern Norwegian. The result is a form–meaning mismatch.
