= Robin Cooper =

Robin Cooper may refer to:

- Robin Cooper (American football), American football coach
- Robin Cooper (linguist), British linguist
- Robin Cooper (politician), Australian politician
- Robert Popper, writer with the pseudonym Robin Cooper
