= Determiner =

Part of speech reflecting the reference of a noun

In natural language, a determiner, also called a determinative (abbreviated det), is a word or affix that is used with or precedes a noun to express its reference. Examples in English include articles (the, a, an), demonstratives (this, that), possessive determiners (my, their), and quantifiers (many, both). Not all languages have determiners, and not all systems of grammatical description recognize them as a distinct category.

== History ==
The linguistics term was coined by Leonard Bloomfield in 1933. Bloomfield observed that, in English, nouns often require a qualifying word, such as an article or adjective. He proposed that such words belong to a distinct class, which he called "determiners".

== Description ==
If a language is said to have determiners, any articles are normally included in the class. Other word types often included are demonstratives and possessives. Some linguists extend the term to other words of the noun phrase such as adjectives and pronouns, or even modifiers in other parts of the sentence.

Qualifying a lexical item as a determiner may depend on a given language's syntax. In English, for example, the words my, your etc. are never used with articles and so can be regarded as possessive determiners; their Italian equivalents mio, tuo etc., on the other hand, are often used together with articles and so may be better classed as adjectives. Not all languages can be said to have a lexically distinct class of determiners.

In some languages, the role of certain determiners can be played by affixes (prefixes or suffixes) attached to a noun or by other types of inflection. For example, definite articles are represented by suffixes in Romanian, Bulgarian, Macedonian, and Swedish. In Swedish, bok ("book"), when definite, becomes boken ("the book"), while the Romanian caiet ("notebook") similarly becomes caietul ("the notebook"). Some languages, such as Finnish, have possessive affixes which play the role of possessive determiners like my and his.

=== Syntactic order ===
Determiners may be predeterminers, central determiners or postdeterminers, based on the order in which they can occur. For example, "all my many very young children" uses one of each. "My all many very young children" is not grammatical because a central determiner cannot precede a predeterminer.

=== Determiners vs. pronouns ===
Determiners are distinguished from pronouns by the presence of nouns.

- Each went his own way. (Each is used as a pronoun, without an accompanying noun.)
- Each man went his own way. (Each is used as a determiner, accompanying the noun man.)

However, plural personal pronouns can act as determiners in certain English constructions:

- We linguists aren’t stupid.
- I'll give you boys three hours to finish the job!
- Nobody listens to us students.

Some theorists unify determiners and pronouns into a single class. For further information, see Pronoun § Linguistics.

=== As a functional head ===
Some theoretical approaches regard determiners as heads of their own phrases, which are described as determiner phrases. In such approaches, noun phrases containing only a noun without a determiner present are called "bare noun phrases", and are considered to be dominated by determiner phrases with null heads. For more detail on theoretical approaches to the status of determiners, see Noun phrase § With and without determiners.

Some theoreticians analyze pronouns as determiners or determiner phrases. See Pronoun: Theoretical considerations. This is consistent with the determiner phrase viewpoint, whereby a determiner, rather than the noun that follows it, is taken to be the head of the phrase.

== Types ==
=== Articles ===
Articles are words used (as a standalone word or a prefix or suffix) to specify the grammatical definiteness of a noun, and, in some languages, volume or numerical scope. Articles often include definite articles (such as English the) and indefinite articles (such as English a and an).

=== Demonstratives ===
Demonstratives are deictic words, such as this and that, used to indicate which entities are being referred to and to distinguish those entities from others. They can indicate how close the things being referenced are to the speaker, listener, or other group of people. In the English language, demonstratives express proximity of things with respect to the speaker.

=== Possessive determiners ===
Possessive determiners such as my, their, Jane’s and the King of England’s modify a noun by attributing possession (or other sense of belonging) to someone or something. They are also known as possessive adjectives.

=== Quantifiers ===
Quantifiers indicate quantity. Some examples of quantifiers include: all, some, many, little, few, and no. Quantifiers only indicate a general quantity of objects, not a precise number such as twelve, first, single, or once (which are considered numerals).

=== Distributive determiners ===
Distributive determiners, also called distributive adjectives, consider members of a group separately, rather than collectively. Words such as each and every are examples of distributive determiners.

=== Interrogative determiners ===
Interrogative determiners such as which, what, and how are used to ask a question:

- Which team won?
- What day is it?
- How many do you want?

== Objections to "determiner" as a universal category ==
Many functionalist linguists dispute that the determiner is a universally valid linguistic category. They argue that the concept is Anglocentric, since it was developed on the basis of the grammar of English and similar languages of north-western Europe. The linguist Thomas Payne comments that the term determiner "is not very viable as a universal natural class", because few languages consistently place all the categories described as determiners in the same place in the noun phrase.

The category "determiner" was developed because in languages like English traditional categories like articles, demonstratives and possessives do not occur together. But in many languages these categories freely co-occur, as Matthew Dryer observes. For instance, Engenni, a Niger-Congo language of Nigeria, allows a possessive word, a demonstrative and an article all to occur as noun modifiers in the same noun phrase:

ani wò âka nà
wife 2SG.POSS that the
that wife of yours

There are also languages in which demonstratives and articles do not normally occur together, but must be placed on opposite sides of the noun. For instance, in Urak Lawoi, a language of Thailand, the demonstrative follows the noun:

rumah besal itu
house big that
that big house

However, the definite article precedes the noun:

koq nanaq
the children
the children

As Dryer observes, there is little justification for a category of determiner in such languages.

== See also ==
- Classifier (linguistics)
- Conservativity
- Determiner spreading
- English determiners
- List of English determiners
