= Robin Cooper (linguist) =

Robin Hayes Cooper, FBA (born 23 December 1947) is a British linguist and logician specialising in formal semantics and computational linguistics. He was a professor of computational linguistics at the University of Gothenburg from 1995 to 2012. He was elected a fellow of the British Academy in 1993. He was the subject of a festschrift: Staffan Larsson and Lars Borin (eds), From Quantification to Conversation: Festschrift for Robin Cooper on the Occasion of his 65th Birthday (London: College Publications, 2012).

== Publications ==
- Quantification and Syntactic Theory (London: Springer, 1983)
- (editor, with Ruth Kempson) Language in Flux: Dialogue Coordination, Language Variation, Change and Evolution (London: College Publications, 2008)
- From Perception to Communication: A Theory of Types of Action and Meaning (Oxford: Oxford University Press, 2023).

== See also ==
- Conservativity
