= Conservativity =

Proposed linguistic universal

In formal semantics conservativity is a proposed linguistic universal which states that any determiner $D$ must obey the equivalence $D(A,B) \leftrightarrow D(A, A\cap B)$. For instance, the English determiner "every" can be seen to be conservative by the equivalence of the following two sentences, schematized in generalized quantifier notation to the right.

1. Every aardvark bites. $\ \ \ \ \ \ \ \ \ \ \ \ \ \ \ \ \ \ \ \ \ \ \ \ \ \ \ \ \ \ \ \rightsquigarrow every(A,B)$
2. Every aardvark is an aardvark that bites. $\ \ \rightsquigarrow every(A,A\cap B)$

Conceptually, conservativity can be understood as saying that the elements of $B$ which are not elements of $A$ are not relevant for evaluating the truth of the determiner phrase as a whole. For instance, the truth of the first sentence above does not depend on which biting non-aardvarks exist.

Conservativity is significant to semantic theory because there are many logically possible determiners which are not attested as denotations of natural language expressions. For instance, consider the imaginary determiner $shmore$ defined so that $shmore(A,B)$ is true iff $|A|>|B|$. If there are 50 biting aardvarks, 50 non-biting aardvarks, and millions of non-aardvark biters, $shmore(A,B)$ will be false but $shmore(A, A\cap B)$ will be true.

Some potential counterexamples to conservativity have been observed, notably, the English expression "only". This expression has been argued to not be a determiner since it can stack with bona fide determiners and can combine with non-nominal constituents such as verb phrases.

1. Only some aardvarks bite.
2. This aardvark will only [VP bite playfully.]

Different analyses have treated conservativity as a constraint on the lexicon, a structural constraint arising from the architecture of the syntax-semantics interface, as well as constraint on learnability.

Jon Barwise and Robin Cooper are generally credited with introducing the conservativity principle for natural-language determiners in 1981.

== See also ==
- Lindström quantifier
- Universal grammar
