= Noun phrase =

Phrase which functions as a noun

A noun phrase – or NP or nominal (phrase) – is a phrase that usually has a noun or pronoun as its head, and has the same grammatical functions as a noun. Noun phrases are very common cross-linguistically, and they may be the most frequently occurring phrase type.

Noun phrases often function as verb subjects and objects, as predicative expressions, and as complements of prepositions. One NP can be embedded inside another NP; for instance, some of his constituents has as a constituent the shorter NP his constituents.

In some theories of grammar, noun phrases with determiners are analyzed as having the determiner as the head of the phrase, see for instance Chomsky (1995) and Hudson (1990).

== Identification ==
Some examples of noun phrases are underlined in the sentences below. The head noun appears in bold.

This election-year's politics are annoying for many people.
Almost every sentence contains at least one noun phrase.

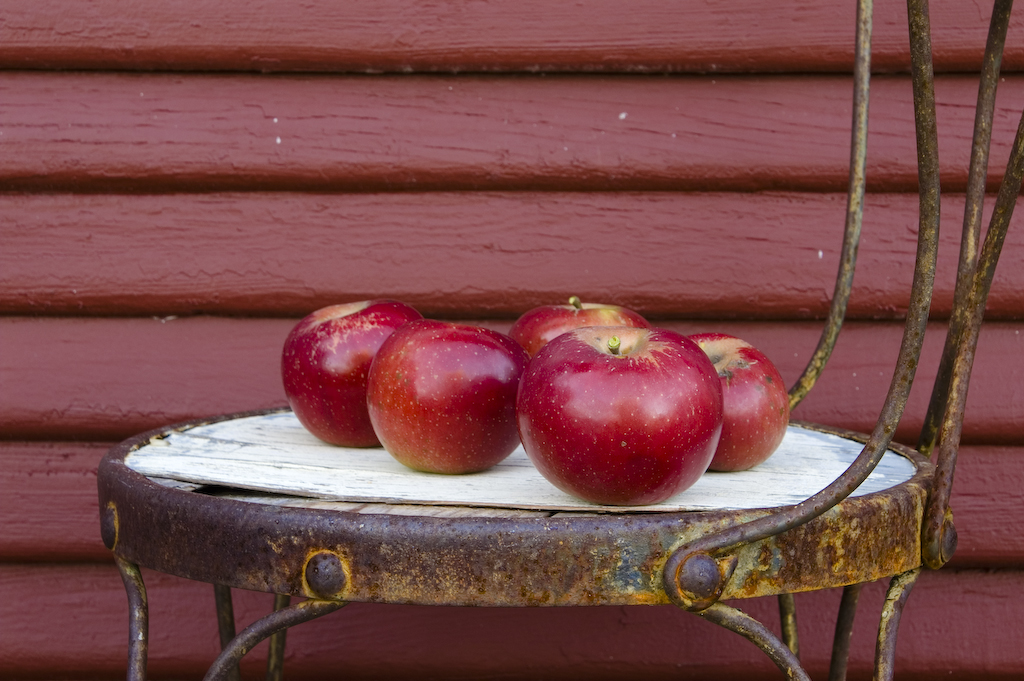
Those five beautiful shiny Arkansas Black apples is a noun phrase of which apples is the head. To test, a single pronoun can replace the whole noun phrase, as in "They look delicious".

Current economic weakness may be a result of high energy prices.

Noun phrases can be identified by the possibility of pronoun substitution, as is illustrated in the examples below.

a. This sentence contains two noun phrases.
b. It contains them.
a. The subject noun phrase that is present in this sentence is long.
b. It is long.
a. Noun phrases can be embedded in other noun phrases.
b. They can be embedded in them.

A string of words that can be replaced by a single pronoun without rendering the sentence grammatically unacceptable is a noun phrase. As to whether the string must contain at least two words, see the following section.

== Status of single words as phrases ==
Traditionally, a phrase is understood to contain two or more words. The traditional progression in the size of syntactic units is word < phrase < clause, and in this approach a single word (such as a noun or pronoun) would not be referred to as a phrase. However, many modern schools of syntax – especially those that have been influenced by X-bar theory – make no such restriction. Here many single words are judged to be phrases based on a desire for theory-internal consistency. A phrase is deemed to be a word or a combination of words that appears in a set syntactic position, for instance in subject position or object position.

On this understanding of phrases, the nouns and pronouns in bold in the following sentences are noun phrases (as well as nouns or pronouns):

He saw someone.
Milk is good.
They spoke about corruption.

The words in bold are called phrases since they appear in the syntactic positions where multiple-word phrases (i.e. traditional phrases) can appear. This practice takes the constellation to be primitive rather than the words themselves. The word he, for instance, functions as a pronoun, but within the sentence it also functions as a noun phrase. The phrase structure grammars of the Chomskyan tradition (government and binding theory and the minimalist program) are primary examples of theories that apply this understanding of phrases. Other grammars such as dependency grammars are likely to reject this approach to phrases, since they take the words themselves to be primitive. For them, phrases must contain two or more words.

== Components ==
A typical noun phrase consists of a noun (the head of the phrase) together with zero or more dependents of various types. (These dependents, since they modify a noun, are called adnominal.) The chief types of these dependents are:

- determiners, such as the, this, my, some, Jane's
- attributive adjectives, such as large, beautiful, sweeter
- adjective phrases and participial phrases, such as extremely large, hard as nails, made of wood, sitting on the step
- noun adjuncts, such as college in the noun phrase a college student
- nouns in certain oblique cases, in languages which have them, such as German des Mannes ("of the man"; genitive form)
- prepositional phrases, such as in the drawing room, of his aunt
- adnominal adverbs and adverbials, such as (over) there in the noun phrase the man (over) there
- relative clauses, such as which we noticed
- other clauses serving as complements to the noun, such as that God exists in the noun phrase the belief that God exists
- infinitive phrases, such as to sing well and to beat in the noun phrases a desire to sing well and the man to beat

The allowability, form and position of these elements depend on the syntax of the language in question. In English, determiners, adjectives (and some adjective phrases) and noun modifiers precede the head noun, whereas the heavier units – phrases and clauses – generally follow it. This is part of a strong tendency in English to place heavier constituents to the right, making English more of a head-initial language. Head-final languages (e.g. Japanese and Turkish) are more likely to place all modifiers before the head noun. Other languages, such as French, often place even single-word adjectives after the noun.

Noun phrases can take different forms than that described above, for example when the head is a pronoun rather than a noun, or when elements are linked with a coordinating conjunction such as and, or, but. For more information about the structure of noun phrases in English, see English grammar § Phrases.

== Syntactic function ==
Noun phrases typically bear argument functions. That is, the syntactic functions that they fulfill are those of the arguments of the main clause predicate, particularly those of subject, object and predicative expression. They also function as arguments in such constructs as participial phrases and prepositional phrases. For example:

For us the news is a concern. – the news is the subject argument

Have you heard the news? – the news is the object argument

That is the news. – the news is the predicative expression following the copula is

They are talking about the news. – the news is the argument in the prepositional phrase about the news

The man reading the news is very tall. – the news is the object argument in the participial phrase reading the news

Sometimes a noun phrase can also function as an adjunct of the main clause predicate, thus taking on an adverbial function, e.g.

Most days I read the newspaper.

She has been studying all night.

== With and without determiners ==
In some languages, including English, noun phrases are required to be "completed" with a determiner in many contexts, and thus a distinction is made in syntactic analysis between phrases that have received their required determiner (such as the big house), and those in which the determiner is lacking (such as big house).

The situation is complicated by the fact that in some contexts a noun phrase may nonetheless be used without a determiner (as in I like big houses); in this case the phrase may be described as having a "null determiner". (Situations in which this is possible depend on the rules of the language in question; for English, see English articles.)

In the original X-bar theory, the two respective types of entity are called noun phrase (NP) and N-bar (N̅, N′). Thus in the sentence Here is the big house, both house and big house are N-bars, while the big house is a noun phrase. In the sentence I like big houses, both houses and big houses are N-bars, but big houses also functions as a noun phrase (in this case without an explicit determiner).

In some modern theories of syntax, however, what are called "noun phrases" above are no longer considered to be headed by a noun, but by the determiner (which may be null), and they are thus called determiner phrases (DP) instead of noun phrases. (In some accounts that take this approach, the constituent lacking the determiner – that called N-bar above – may be referred to as a noun phrase.)

This analysis of noun phrases is widely referred to as the DP hypothesis. It has been the preferred analysis of noun phrases in the minimalist program from its start (since the early 1990s), though the arguments in its favor tend to be theory-internal. By taking the determiner, a function word, to be head over the noun, a structure is established that is analogous to the structure of the finite clause, with a complementizer. Apart from the minimalist program, however, the DP hypothesis is rejected by most other modern theories of syntax and grammar, in part because these theories lack the relevant functional categories. Dependency grammars, for instance, almost all assume the traditional NP analysis of noun phrases.

For illustrations of different analyses of noun phrases depending on whether the DP hypothesis is rejected or accepted, see the next section.

== Tree representations ==
The representation of noun phrases using parse trees depends on the basic approach to syntactic structure adopted. The layered trees of many phrase structure grammars grant noun phrases an intricate structure that acknowledges a hierarchy of functional projections. Dependency grammars, in contrast, since the basic architecture of dependency places a major limitation on the amount of structure that the theory can assume, produce simple, relatively flat structures for noun phrases.

The representation also depends on whether the noun or the determiner is taken to be the head of the phrase (see the discussion of the DP hypothesis in the previous section).

Below are some possible trees for the two noun phrases the big house and big houses (as in the sentences Here is the big house and I like big houses).

1. Phrase-structure trees, first using the original X-bar theory, then using the current DP approach:

     NP                NP        |        DP                DP
   /    \              |         |      /    \              |
det      N'            N'        |   det      NP            NP
 |     /   \         /   \       |    |     /   \         /   \
the  adj   N'      adj    N'     |   the  adj   NP      adj    NP
      |    |        |     |      |         |    |        |     |
     big   N       big    N      |        big   N       big    N
           |              |      |              |              |
         house          houses   |            house          houses

2. Dependency trees, first using the traditional NP approach, then using the DP approach:

          house          houses  |   the             (null)
        /   /            /       |        \                 \
      /    /          big        |          house            houses
   the  big                      |         /                 /
                                 |      big               big

The following trees represent a more complex phrase. For simplicity, only dependency-based trees are given.

The first tree is based on the traditional assumption that nouns, rather than determiners, are the heads of phrases.

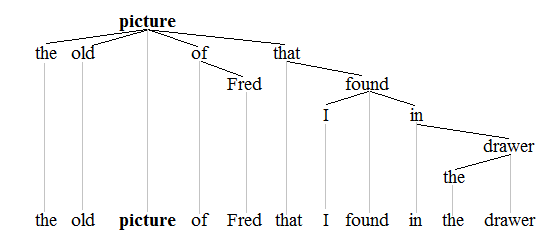

The head noun picture has the four dependents the, old, of Fred, and that I found in the drawer. The tree shows how the lighter dependents appear as pre-dependents (preceding their head) and the heavier ones as post-dependents (following their head).

The second tree assumes the DP hypothesis, namely that determiners serve as phrase heads, rather than nouns.

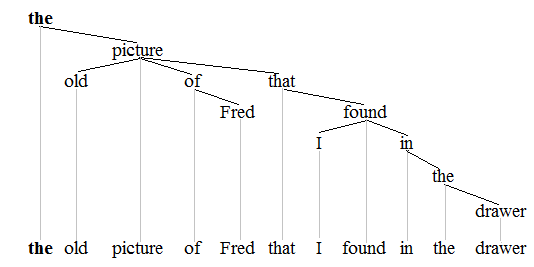

The determiner the is now depicted as the head of the entire phrase, thus making the phrase a determiner phrase. There is still a noun phrase present (old picture of Fred that I found in the drawer) but this phrase is below the determiner.

== History ==
An early conception of the noun phrase can be found in First work in English by Alexander Murison. In this conception a noun phrase is "the infinitive of the verb" (p. 146), which may appear "in any position in the sentence where a noun may appear". For example, to be just is more important than to be generous has two underlined infinitives which may be replaced by nouns, as in justice is more important than generosity. This same conception can be found in subsequent grammars, such as 1878's A Tamil Grammar or 1882's Murby's English grammar and analysis, where the conception of an X phrase is a phrase that can stand in for X. By 1912, the concept of a noun phrase as being based around a noun can be found, for example, "an adverbial noun phrases is a group of words of which the noun is the base word, that tells the time or place of an action, or how long, how far, or how much". By 1924, the idea of a noun phrase being a noun plus dependents seems to be established. For example, "Note order of words in noun-phrase--noun + adj. + genitive" suggests a more modern conception of noun phrases.

== See also ==
- Chunking (computational linguistics)
- Conservativity
- Nominal group (functional grammar)
