= List of English determiners =

This is a list of English determiners.

== Alphabetical List (excluding numerals above three) ==
- a
- a few
- a little
- all
- an
- another
- any
- anybody
- anyone
- anything
- anywhere
- both
- certain (also adjective)
- each
- either
- enough
- every
- everybody
- everyone
- everything
- everywhere
- few
- fewer
- fewest
- last (also adjective)
- least
- less (also adverb and preposition)
- little (also adjective)
- many
- many a
- more (also adverb)
- most (also adverb)
- much
- neither
- next (also adjective)
- no (also interjection)
- no one
- nobody
- none
- nothing
- nowhere
- once
- one (also noun and pronoun)
- said (also verb)
- several (also adjective)
- some
- somebody
- something
- somewhere
- sufficient (also adjective)
- that
- the
- these
- this
- those
- three (also noun)
- thrice
- twice
- two (also noun)
- us (also pronoun)
- various
- we (also pronoun)
- what (also pronoun and adjective)
- whatever
- which (also pronoun)
- whichever
- you (also pronoun)
- zero (also noun)

All cardinal numerals are also included.

== Sub classifications from CGEL ==
=== Articles ===
- a / an
- the

=== Demonstratives ===
- that / those
- this / these

=== Personal determiners ===
- we / us
- you
- them (In some dialects such as the Ozark dialect.)

=== Universal determiners ===
- all
- both

=== Distributive determiners ===
- each
- every

=== Existential determiners ===
- any
- some

=== Cardinal numerals ===
- zero
- one
- two
- three
- four
- five
- etc.

=== Disjunctive determiners ===
- either
- neither

=== Negative determiners ===
- no
- none

=== Alternative-additive determiner ===
- another

=== Positive paucal determiners ===
- a few
- a little
- several

=== Degree determiners ===
- few / fewer / fewest
- little / less / least
- many / more / most
- much / more / most

=== Sufficiency determiners ===
- enough
- sufficient

=== Temporal determiners ===
- last
- next

=== Interrogative determiners ===
- what
- whatever
- which
- whichever

=== Marginal determiners ===
- certain
- said
- various

=== Relative determiners ===
- what
- whatever
- which
- whichever

=== Compound determiners ===
- a few, a little
- -body, -one, -thing, & -where
  - anybody, anyone, anything, anywhere
  - everybody, everyone, everything, everywhere
  - nobody, no one, nothing, nowhere
  - somebody, someone, something, somewhere
- once, twice, thrice
- one hundred, two thousand, three million, etc.
- many a
- whatever, whichever

== Other grammars ==
=== Predeterminers ===
- half, a third, a quarter, etc.
- such, quite, rather
- twice, thrice
- both, all
- double, triple, quadruple, etc.
