= Richard Hudson (linguist) =

British linguist (born 1939)

Emeritus Professor Richard Hudson FBA
- Born: 18 September 1939 (age 87); Sussex, England
- Spouse: Gaynor Evans
- Children: 2
- Parent: John Pilkington Hudson (father)

Academic background
- Education: Corpus Christi College, Cambridge (B.A.); School of Oriental and African Studies (Ph.D.)
- Thesis: A Grammatical Study of Beja (1964)

Academic work
- Discipline: Linguist
- Institutions: University College London
- Notable ideas: Word Grammar
- Website: dickhudson.com

Richard Anthony Hudson FBA (born 18 September 1939) is a British linguist. He is best known for Word Grammar, a wide-ranging theory of syntax.

== Life ==
Hudson is the son of the horticulturalist and bomb-disposal officer John Pilkington Hudson. He has lived in England for most of his life (with three years in New Zealand, 1945–1948). He studied linguistics at Loughborough Grammar School in Leicestershire (1948–1958), Corpus Christi College, Cambridge (1958–1961) and the School of Oriental and African Studies (Ph.D., 1961–1964). He worked with Michael Halliday as research assistant on two projects at University College London: on the grammar of scientific English with Rodney Huddleston (1964–1967), and on Linguistics and English Teaching (1967–1970). In 1970, he was appointed lecturer at UCL, where he spent the rest of his working life, mostly in the Department of Phonetics and Linguistics, retiring in 2004. He has also worked to build bridges between academic linguistics and teaching of (and about) language in UK schools.

== Notable works ==
- Hudson, Richard (1976). Arguments for a Non-Transformational Grammar. Chicago: Chicago University Press. ISBN 9780226357997.
- Hudson, Richard (1984). Word Grammar. Oxford: Blackwell. ISBN 9780631131861.
- Hudson, Richard (1996). Sociolinguistics (2nd ed.). Cambridge: Cambridge University Press. ISBN 9780521565141.
- Hudson, Richard (1997). "Inherent Variability and Linguistic Theory". Cognitive Linguistics. 8 (1): 73–108. doi:10.1515/cogl.1997.8.1.73. S2CID 143119785.
- Hudson, Richard (2000). "Language as a Cognitive Network". In Simonsen, Hanne Gram; Endresen, Rolf Theil (eds.). A Cognitive Approach to the Verb: Morphological and Constructional Perspectives. Berlin: Mouton de Gruyter. pp. 49–72. ISBN 9783110170313.
- Hudson, Richard (2003). "Mismatches in Default Inheritance". In Francis, Elaine J.; Michaelis, Laura A. (eds.). Mismatch: Form-Function Incongruity and the Architecture of Grammar. Stanford: CSLI Publications. pp. 355–402. ISBN 9781575863832.
- Hudson, Richard (2007). Language Networks: The New Word Grammar. Oxford: Oxford University Press. ISBN 9780199298389.
- Hudson, Richard (2010). An Introduction to Word Grammar. Cambridge: Cambridge University Press. ISBN 9780521721646.
