= Context =

Non-language factors that enhance understanding of communication

In semiotics, linguistics, sociology and anthropology, context refers to those objects or entities which surround a focal event, in these disciplines typically a communicative event, of some kind. Context is "a frame that surrounds the event and provides resources for its appropriate interpretation". It is thus a relative concept, only definable with respect to some focal event within a frame, not independently of that frame.

== In linguistics ==
In the 19th century, it was debated whether the most fundamental principle in language was contextuality or compositionality, and compositionality was usually preferred. Verbal context refers to the text or speech surrounding an expression (word, sentence, or speech act). Verbal context influences the way an expression is understood; hence the norm of not citing people out of context. Since much contemporary linguistics takes texts, discourses, or conversations as the object of analysis, the modern study of verbal context takes place in terms of the analysis of discourse structures and their mutual relationships, for instance the coherence relation between sentences.

Neurolinguistic analysis of context has shown that the interaction between interlocutors defined as parsers creates a reaction in the brain that reflects predictive and interpretative reactions. It can be said then that mutual knowledge, co-text, genre, speakers, hearers create a neurolinguistic composition of context.

Traditionally, in sociolinguistics, social contexts were defined in terms of objective social variables, such as those of class, gender, age or race. More recently, social contexts tend to be defined in terms of the social identity being construed and displayed in text and talk by language users.

The influence of context parameters on language use or discourse is usually studied in terms of language variation, style or register (see Stylistics). The basic assumption here is that language users adapt the properties of their language use (such as intonation, lexical choice, syntax, and other aspects of formulation) to the current communicative situation. In this sense, language use or discourse may be called more or less 'appropriate' in a given context.

== In linguistic anthropology ==
In the theory of sign phenomena, adapted from that of Charles Sanders Peirce, which forms the basis for much contemporary work in linguistic anthropology, the concept of context is integral to the definition of the index, one of the three classes of signs comprising Peirce's second trichotomy. An index is a sign which signifies by virtue of "pointing to" some component in its context, or in other words an indexical sign is related to its object by virtue of their co-occurrence within some kind of contextual frame.

=== "High-context" and "low-context" cultures ===
In anthropology, high-context and low-context cultures are ends of a continuum of how explicit the messages exchanged in a culture are and how important the context is in communication. The distinction between cultures with high and low contexts is intended to draw attention to variations in both spoken and non-spoken forms of communication. The continuum pictures how people communicate with others through their range of communication abilities: utilizing gestures, relations, body language, verbal messages, or non-verbal messages.

"High-" and "low-" context cultures typically refer to language groups, nationalities, or regional communities. However, the concept may also apply to corporations, professions, and other cultural groups, as well as to settings such as online and offline communication.

High-context cultures often exhibit less-direct verbal and nonverbal communication, utilizing small communication gestures and reading more meaning into these less-direct messages. Low-context cultures do the opposite; direct verbal communication is needed to properly understand a message being communicated and relies heavily on explicit verbal skills.

The model of high-context and low-context cultures offers a popular framework in intercultural communication studies but has been criticized as lacking empirical validation.

== In natural language processing ==
In word-sense disambiguation, the meanings of words are inferred from the context where they occur.

=== In large language models ===
The context window of a large language model (LLM) is the maximum number of tokens that can be used by the model at one time when generating an output. It determines how much information, such as text from a conversation or document, the model can take into account when producing a response.

A language model can have a long context length, but unable to use it effectively, a phenomenon sometimes called "context decay". Consequently, it is the effective context length that is of interest, i.e. the length of the context that a model can use effectively.

Information outside the context window is not directly available to the model, but retrieval-augmented generation can retrieve information from external sources to put into the context window. A longer context window can allow a model to work with longer prompts, conversations, documents, codebases, or retrieved passages without first compressing or discarding as much information. It has been compared to working memory or attention span.

== In formal language theory ==
In formal language theory, a context-sensitive language is a formal language that can be defined by a context-sensitive grammar, where the applicability of a production rule may depend on the surrounding context of symbols. Unlike context-free grammars, which can apply rules regardless of context, context-sensitive grammars allow rules to be applied only when specific neighboring symbols are present, enabling them to express dependencies and agreements between distant parts of a string.

These languages correspond to type-1 languages in the Chomsky hierarchy and are equivalently defined by noncontracting grammars (grammars where production rules never decrease the total length of a string). Context-sensitive languages can model natural language phenomena such as subject-verb agreement, cross-serial dependencies, and other complex syntactic relationships that cannot be captured by simpler grammar types, making them important for computational linguistics and natural language processing.

== Contextual variables ==
Communicative systems presuppose contexts that are structured in terms of particular physical and communicative dimensions, for instance time, location, and communicative role.

== See also ==
- Aberrant decoding
- Context principle
- Conversational scoreboard
- Deixis
- Opaque context
