= LTAG =

LTAG can refer to:

- Incirlik Air Base, ICAO code
- Lexical tree-adjoining grammar, a grammar formalism
