= Anna Szabolcsi =

Hungarian linguist, semanticist

Anna Szabolcsi ([sabolt͡ʃi]) is a linguist whose research has focused on semantics, syntax, and the syntax–semantics interface. She was born and educated in Hungary, and received her Ph.D. from the Hungarian Academy of Sciences, Budapest.

She is currently a professor of linguistics at New York University. She has been a research fellow at the Research Institute for Linguistics of the Hungarian Academy of Sciences, Budapest, and a professor at UCLA.

Szabolcsi was one of the first to propose that noun phrases are structurally parallel to clauses and alongside Mark Steedman and others initiated research in combinatory categorial grammar. More recently she has worked on quantification, islands, polarity, verbal complexes, overt nominative subjects in infinitival complements, and cross-linguistic semantics.
