= Generalized context-free grammar =

Abstract language theory concept

Generalized context-free grammar (GCFG) is a grammar formalism that expands on context-free grammars by adding potentially non-context-free composition functions to rewrite rules. Head grammar (and its weak equivalents) is an instance of such a GCFG which is known to be especially adept at handling a wide variety of non-CF properties of natural language.

== Description ==
A GCFG consists of two components: a set of composition functions that combine string tuples, and a set of rewrite rules. The composition functions all have the form $f(\langle x_1, ..., x_m \rangle, \langle y_1, ..., y_n \rangle, ...) = \gamma$, where $\gamma$ is either a single string tuple, or some use of a (potentially different) composition function which reduces to a string tuple. Rewrite rules look like $X \to f(Y, Z, ...)$, where $Y$, $Z$, ... are string tuples or non-terminal symbols.

The rewrite semantics of GCFGs is fairly straightforward. An occurrence of a non-terminal symbol is rewritten using rewrite rules as in a context-free grammar, eventually yielding just compositions (composition functions applied to string tuples or other compositions). The composition functions are then applied, successively reducing the tuples to a single tuple.

== Example ==
A simple translation of a context-free grammar into a GCFG can be performed in the following fashion. Given the grammar in (1), which generates the palindrome language $\{ ww^R : w \in \{a, b\}^{*} \}$, where $w^R$ is the string reverse of $w$, we can define the composition function conc as in (2a) and the rewrite rules as in (2b).

$S \to \epsilon ~|~ aSa ~|~ bSb$	1

$conc(\langle x \rangle, \langle y \rangle, \langle z \rangle) = \langle xyz \rangle$	2a

$S \to conc(\langle \epsilon \rangle, \langle \epsilon \rangle, \langle \epsilon \rangle) ~|~ conc(\langle a \rangle, S, \langle a \rangle) ~|~ conc(\langle b \rangle, S, \langle b \rangle)$	2b

The CF production of abbbba is

S

aSa

abSba

abbSbba

abbbba

and the corresponding GCFG production is

$$S \to conc(\langle a \rangle, S, \langle a \rangle)$$

$$conc(\langle a \rangle, conc(\langle b \rangle, S, \langle b \rangle), \langle a \rangle)$$

$$conc(\langle a \rangle, conc(\langle b \rangle, conc(\langle b \rangle, S, \langle b \rangle), \langle b \rangle), \langle a \rangle)$$

$$conc(\langle a \rangle, conc(\langle b \rangle, conc(\langle b \rangle, conc(\langle \epsilon \rangle, \langle \epsilon \rangle, \langle \epsilon \rangle), \langle b \rangle), \langle b \rangle), \langle a \rangle)$$

$$conc(\langle a \rangle, conc(\langle b \rangle, conc(\langle b \rangle, \langle \epsilon \rangle, \langle b \rangle), \langle b \rangle), \langle a \rangle)$$

$$conc(\langle a \rangle, conc(\langle b \rangle, \langle bb \rangle, \langle b \rangle), \langle a \rangle)$$

$$conc(\langle a \rangle, \langle bbbb \rangle, \langle a \rangle)$$

$$\langle abbbba \rangle$$

== Linear Context-free Rewriting Systems (LCFRSs) ==
Weir (1988) describes two properties of composition functions, linearity and regularity. A function defined as $f(x_1, ..., x_n) = ...$ is linear if and only if each variable appears at most once on either side of the =, making $f(x) = g(x, y)$ linear but not $f(x) = g(x, x)$. A function defined as $f(x_1, ..., x_n) = ...$ is regular if the left hand side and right hand side have exactly the same variables, making $f(x, y) = g(y, x)$ regular but not $f(x) = g(x, y)$ or $f(x, y) = g(x)$.

A grammar in which all composition functions are both linear and regular is called a Linear Context-free Rewriting System (LCFRS). LCFRS is a proper subclass of the GCFGs, i.e. it has strictly less computational power than the GCFGs as a whole.

On the other hand, LCFRSs are strictly more expressive than linear-indexed grammars and their weakly equivalent variant tree adjoining grammars (TAGs). Head grammar is another example of an LCFRS that is strictly less powerful than the class of LCFRSs as a whole.

LCFRS are weakly equivalent to (set-local) multicomponent TAGs (MCTAGs) and also with multiple context-free grammar (MCFGs ). and minimalist grammars (MGs). The languages generated by LCFRS (and their weakly equivalents) can be parsed in polynomial time.

== See also ==
- Range concatenation grammar
