= Tree-adjoining grammar =

Grammar formalism

Tree-adjoining grammar (TAG) is a grammar formalism defined by Aravind Joshi. Tree-adjoining grammars are somewhat similar to context-free grammars, but the elementary unit of rewriting is the tree rather than the symbol. Whereas context-free grammars have rules for rewriting symbols as strings of other symbols, tree-adjoining grammars have rules for rewriting the nodes of trees as other trees (see tree (graph theory) and tree (data structure)).

== History ==
TAG originated in investigations by Joshi and his students into the family of adjunction grammars (AG), the "string grammar" of Zellig Harris. AGs handle exocentric properties of language in a natural and effective way, but do not have a good characterization of endocentric constructions; the converse is true of rewrite grammars, or phrase-structure grammar (PSG). In 1969, Joshi introduced a family of grammars that exploits this complementarity by mixing the two types of rules. A few very simple rewrite rules suffice to generate the vocabulary of strings for adjunction rules. This family is distinct from the Chomsky-Schützenberger hierarchy but intersects it in interesting and linguistically relevant ways. The center strings and adjunct strings can also be generated by a dependency grammar, avoiding the limitations of rewrite systems entirely.

== Description ==
Schematic illustration of the adjunction operation: the tree $\alpha$ combines with an auxiliary tree $\beta$ at a node labelled with non-terminal symbol $X$, which must also be the root and foot node of the auxiliary tree. The resulting tree is deeper than the original one.

Schematic illustration of the substitution operation: two trees ($\alpha$ and $\beta$; note that these need not be elementary trees) are joined on a node labelled with non-terminal $X$; this node is one of the leaf nodes marked for substitution in $\alpha$, and the root of $\beta$ is a node with the same non-terminal.

A TAG can be defined as a 5-tuple $\langle \Sigma, NT, I, A, S\rangle$ with:

- $\Sigma$ as the finite set of terminal symbols;
- $NT$ as the finite set of non-terminal symbols, disjunct from $\Sigma$;
- $I$ as a finite set of finite trees called initial trees;
  - Initial trees have non-terminals as inner nodes. The frontier can consist of terminals and non-terminals. Non-terminals at the frontier are marked for substitution (typically by adding the symbol '$\downarrow$' after the non-terminal symbol). Nodes marked for substitution cannot be adjoined to.
- $A$ as a finite set of finite trees called auxiliary trees;
  - Auxiliary trees have a special leaf node known as the foot node (typically marked by '$\ast$') which needs to have the same non-terminal symbol as the root of the tree. Foot nodes cannot be substituted; all other non-terminal nodes at the frontier are marked for substitution. As in initial trees, inner nodes have non-terminal symbols.
- $S$ as the special start symbol, belonging to the set of non-terminals.

Additionally, TAGs with adjunction constraints on nodes have been introduced. An adjunction constraint on a node can: completely disallow adjunction (NA, for null adjunction); make it obligatory (OA); or only allow selected auxiliary trees to adjoin (SA).

The two types of basic tree in TAG—initial trees (often denoted by '$\alpha$') and auxiliary trees ('$\beta$')—are together called elementary trees. Initial trees represent basic valency relations, while auxiliary trees allow for recursion.

A derivation starts with an initial tree, which is combined with further trees via either substitution or adjunction. Substitution replaces a frontier node with an initial tree whose root node has the same label as the leaf for which it is substituted. Adjunction inserts an auxiliary tree—at either a frontier or an internal node—whose root and foot labels both match the label of the node whereat it adjoins. Adjunction can thus have the effect of inserting an auxiliary tree into the center of another tree, which operation may be applied recursively.

== Complexity and application ==
For every context-free grammar, a tree-adjoining grammar can be generated which accepts the same string-language. Thus, TAGs can generate all context-free languages; they can generate, as well, some—but not all—context-sensitive languages.

Two examples of context-sensitive/non-context-free languages that TAGs (with adjunction constraints) can generate are:

- The copy language (i.e. the language of squares), in which an arbitrary string is repeated: $\left\{ ww \mid w \in \Sigma^* \right\}$
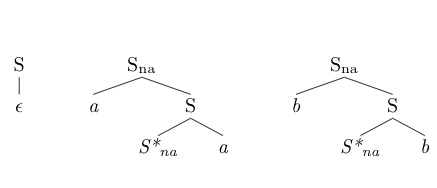
  The three elementary trees necessary to generate the copy language with the alphabet containing only letters a and b.
- The count-4 language: $\{a^n b^n c^n d^n | 1 \le n \}$
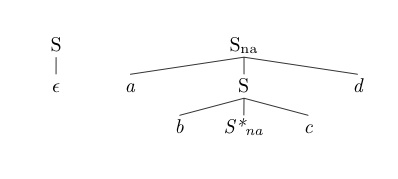
  Trees necessary to generate the count-4 language including the empty word $\epsilon$, formally defined as $\text{Count}_4 = \left\{ a^n b^n c^n d^n \mid n \geq 0 \right\}$.

Tree-adjoining grammars are more powerful (in terms of weak generative capacity) than context-free grammars, but less powerful than linear context-free rewriting systems, indexed, (Note: This, since—for each tree-adjoining grammar—a linear indexed grammar can be found that produces the same language (see below); and, for the latter, a weakly equivalent (proper) indexed grammar can be found in turn (see: Indexed grammar#Computational Power).) or context-sensitive grammars.

Two examples of context-sensitive languages that TAGs cannot generate are:

- The language of triplicated strings (i.e. the language of cubes): $\left\{ www \mid w \in \Sigma^* \right\}$
- Languages with more than four distinct character-strings of equal length; e.g., the count-5 language: $\{a^n b^n c^n d^n f^n | 1 \le n \}$

The processing of languages that TAGs can generate may be represented by an embedded pushdown automaton.

Tree-adjoining grammars are often described as mildly context-sensitive. These grammar classes are conjectured to be powerful enough to model natural languages while remaining efficiently parsable in the general case.

=== Equivalences ===
Vijay-Shanker and Weir (1994) demonstrated that linear indexed grammars, combinatory categorial grammar, tree-adjoining grammars, and head grammars are weakly equivalent formalisms, in that they all define the same string languages.

== Variants ==
Lexicalized tree-adjoining grammars (LTAG) are a variant of TAG in which each elementary tree (initial or auxiliary) is associated with a lexical item. Each tree has at least one terminal as a leaf node, which is then called the (lexical) anchor of the tree. A lexicalized grammar for English has been developed by the XTAG Research Group of the Institute for Research in Cognitive Science at the University of Pennsylvania.

Other variants of TAG allow multi-component trees, trees with multiple foot nodes, and other extensions.

== See also ==
- String grammar
