= Context-sensitive language =

Language defined by context-sensitive grammar

In formal language theory, a context-sensitive language is a formal language that can be defined by a context-sensitive grammar, where the applicability of a production rule may depend on the surrounding context of symbols. Unlike context-free grammars, which can apply rules regardless of context, context-sensitive grammars allow rules to be applied only when specific neighboring symbols are present, enabling them to express dependencies and agreements between distant parts of a string.

These languages correspond to type-1 languages in the Chomsky hierarchy and are equivalently defined by noncontracting grammars (grammars where production rules never decrease the total length of a string). Context-sensitive languages can model natural language phenomena such as subject-verb agreement, cross-serial dependencies, and other complex syntactic relationships that cannot be captured by simpler grammar types, making them important for computational linguistics and natural language processing.

== Computational properties ==
Computationally, a context-sensitive language is equivalent to a linear bounded nondeterministic Turing machine, also called a linear bounded automaton. That is a non-deterministic Turing machine with a tape of only $kn$ cells, where $n$ is the size of the input and $k$ is a constant associated with the machine. This means that every formal language that can be decided by such a machine is a context-sensitive language, and every context-sensitive language can be decided by such a machine.

This set of languages is also known as NLINSPACE or NSPACE(O(n)), because they can be accepted using linear space on a non-deterministic Turing machine. The class LINSPACE (or DSPACE(O(n))) is defined the same, except using a deterministic Turing machine. Clearly LINSPACE is a subset of NLINSPACE, but it is not known whether LINSPACE = NLINSPACE.

== Examples ==
One of the simplest context-sensitive but not context-free languages is $L = \{ a^nb^nc^n : n \ge 1 \}$: the language of all strings consisting of n occurrences of the symbol "a", then n "b"s, then n "c"s (abc, aabbcc, aaabbbccc, etc.). A superset of this language, called the Bach language, is defined as the set of all strings where "a", "b" and "c" (or any other set of three symbols) occurs equally often (aabccb, baabcaccb, etc.) and is also context-sensitive.

L can be shown to be a context-sensitive language by constructing a linear bounded automaton which accepts L. The language can easily be shown to be neither regular nor context-free by applying the respective pumping lemmas for each of the language classes to L.

Similarly:

$L_\textit{Cross} = \{ a^mb^nc^{m}d^{n} : m \ge 1, n \ge 1 \}$ is another context-sensitive language; the corresponding context-sensitive grammar can be easily projected starting with two context-free grammars generating sentential forms in the formats $a^mC^m$ and $B^nd^n$ and then supplementing them with a permutation production like $CB\rightarrow BC$, a new starting symbol and standard syntactic sugar.

$L_{MUL3} = \{ a^mb^nc^{mn} : m \ge 1, n \ge 1 \}$ is another context-sensitive language (the "3" in the name of this language is intended to mean a ternary alphabet); that is, the "product" operation defines a context-sensitive language (but the "sum" defines only a context-free language as the grammar $S\rightarrow aSc|R$ and $R\rightarrow bRc|bc$ shows). Because of the commutative property of the product, the most intuitive grammar for $L_\textit{MUL3}$ is ambiguous. This problem can be avoided considering a somehow more restrictive definition of the language, e.g. $L_\textit{ORDMUL3} = \{ a^mb^nc^{mn} : 1 < m < n \}$. This can be specialized to $L_\textit{MUL1} = \{ a^{mn} : m > 1, n > 1 \}$ and, from this, to $L_{m^2} = \{ a^{m^2} : m > 1 \}$, $L_{m^3} = \{ a^{m^3} : m > 1 \}$, etc.

$L_{REP} = \{ w^{|w|} : w \in \Sigma^* \}$ is a context-sensitive language. The corresponding context-sensitive grammar can be obtained as a generalization of the context-sensitive grammars for $L_\textit{Square} = \{ w^2 : w \in \Sigma^* \}$, $L_\textit{Cube} = \{ w^3 : w \in \Sigma^* \}$, etc.

$L_\textit{EXP} = \{ a^{2^n} : n \ge 1 \}$ is a context-sensitive language.

$L_\textit{PRIMES2} = \{ w : |w| \mbox { is prime } \}$ is a context-sensitive language (the "2" in the name of this language is intended to mean a binary alphabet). This was proved by Hartmanis using pumping lemmas for regular and context-free languages over a binary alphabet and, after that, sketching a linear bounded multitape automaton accepting $L_{PRIMES2}$.

$L_\textit{PRIMES1} = \{ a^p : p \mbox { is prime } \}$ is a context-sensitive language (the "1" in the name of this language is intended to mean a unary alphabet). This was credited by A. Salomaa to Matti Soittola by means of a linear bounded automaton over a unary alphabet (pages 213–214, exercise 6.8) and also to Marti Penttonen by means of a context-sensitive grammar also over a unary alphabet (See: Formal Languages by A. Salomaa, page 14, Example 2.5).

An example of recursive language that is not context-sensitive is any recursive language whose decision is an EXPSPACE-hard problem, say, the set of pairs of equivalent regular expressions with exponentiation.

== Properties of context-sensitive languages ==
- The union, intersection, concatenation of two context-sensitive languages is context-sensitive, also the Kleene plus of a context-sensitive language is context-sensitive.
- The complement of a context-sensitive language is itself context-sensitive a result known as the Immerman–Szelepcsényi theorem.
- Membership of a string in a language defined by an arbitrary context-sensitive grammar, or by an arbitrary deterministic context-sensitive grammar, is a PSPACE-complete problem.

== See also ==
- List of parser generators for context-sensitive languages
- Indexed languages – a strict subset of the context-sensitive languages
- Weir hierarchy
- Mildly context-sensitive grammar formalism – a collection of formalisms for various subclasses of context-sensitive languages
