= Mark Steedman =

British computational linguist (born 1946)

- Born: 18 September 1946 (age 80)
- Education: Graduate; B.Sc. in Experimental Psychology; Ph.D. in Artificial Intelligence
- Alma mater: University of Sussex; University of Edinburgh

Mark Jerome Steedman (born 18 September 1946) is a British computational linguist and cognitive scientist.

== Biography ==
Steedman graduated from the University of Sussex in 1968, with a B.Sc. in Experimental Psychology, and from the University of Edinburgh in 1973, with a Ph.D. in Artificial Intelligence (Dissertation: The Formal Description of Musical Perception gained in 1972. Advisor: Prof. H.C. Longuet-Higgins FRS).

He has held posts as Lecturer in Psychology, University of Warwick (1977–83); Lecturer and Reader in Computational Linguistics, University of Edinburgh (1983–8); Associate and full Professor in Computer and Information Sciences, University of Pennsylvania (1988–98). He has held visiting positions at the University of Texas at Austin, the Max Planck Institute for Psycholinguistics, Radboud University Nijmegen, and the University of Pennsylvania, Philadelphia.

Steedman currently holds the Chair of Cognitive Science in the School of Informatics at the University of Edinburgh (1998– ). He works in computational linguistics, artificial intelligence, and cognitive science, on Generation of Meaningful Intonation for Speech by Artificial Agents, Animated Conversation, The Communicative Use of Gesture, Tense and Aspect, and combinatory categorial grammar (CCG). He is also interested in Computational Musical Analysis and combinatory logic.

== Distinctions ==
- Member of the Academia Europæa (2006)
- Fellow of the British Academy (2002).
- Fellow of the Royal Society of Edinburgh (2002)
- AAAI Fellow (1993)
- President elect for 2008 of the Association for Computational Linguistics
- Fellow of the Association for Computational Linguistics (2012)

== Principal publications ==
- Steedman, Mark (1996). Surface structure and interpretation. Linguistic Inquiry Monograph. Vol. 30. Cambridge, MA: MIT Press. p. 123. ISBN 978-0-262-19379-5.
- Steedman, Mark (2000). The Syntactic Process. Language, Speech, and Communication. Cambridge, MA: MIT Press. p. 344. ISBN 978-0-262-69268-7.
- Steedman, Mark (Fall 2000). "Information Structure and the Syntax-Phonology Interface". Linguistic Inquiry. 31 (4): 649–689. doi:10.1162/002438900554505. ISSN 0024-3892. S2CID 9084597. Archived from the original on 17 July 2010.
