= Andrey Markov Jr. =

Soviet mathematician (1903–1979)

Andrey Andreyevich Markov (Russian: Андре́й Андре́евич Ма́рков; 22 September 1903, Saint Petersburg – 11 October 1979, Moscow) was a Soviet mathematician, the son of the Russian mathematician Andrey Markov Sr, and one of the key founders of the Russian school of constructive mathematics and logic. He made outstanding contributions to various areas of mathematics, including differential equations, topology, mathematical logic and the foundations of mathematics.

His name is in particular associated with Markov's principle and Markov's rule in mathematical logic, Markov's theorem in knot theory and Markov algorithm in theoretical computer science.

An important result that he proved in 1947 was that the word problem for semigroups was unsolvable; Emil Leon Post obtained the same result independently at about the same time.

In 1953 he became a member of the Communist Party.

In 1960, Markov obtained fundamental results showing that the classification of four-dimensional manifolds is undecidable: no general algorithm exists for distinguishing two arbitrary manifolds with four or more dimensions. This is because four-dimensional manifolds have sufficient flexibility to allow us to embed any algorithm within their structure. Hence, classifying all four-manifolds would imply a solution to Turing's halting problem. Embedding implies failure to create a correspondence between algorithms and indexing (naturally uncountably infinite, but even larger) of the four-manifolds structure. Failure is in Cantor's sense. Indexing is in Godel's sense.

His doctoral students include Boris Kushner, Gennady Makanin, and Nikolai Shanin.

== Awards and honors ==
- Medal "For Valiant Labour in the Great Patriotic War 1941–1945" (1945)
- Order of the Badge of Honour (1945)
- Medal "For the Defence of Leningrad" (1946)
- Order of Lenin (1954)
- Order of the Red Banner of Labour (1963)
