= Cone (formal languages) =

In formal language theory, a cone is a set of formal languages that has some desirable closure properties enjoyed by some well-known sets of languages, in particular by the families of regular languages, context-free languages and the recursively enumerable languages. The concept of a cone is a more abstract notion that subsumes all of these families. A similar notion is the faithful cone, having somewhat relaxed conditions. For example, the context-sensitive languages do not form a cone, but still have the required properties to form a faithful cone.

The terminology cone has a French origin. In the American oriented literature one usually speaks of a full trio. The trio corresponds to the faithful cone.

== Definition ==
A cone is a family $\mathcal{S}$ of languages such that $\mathcal{S}$ contains at least one non-empty language, and for any $L \in \mathcal{S}$ over some alphabet $\Sigma$,

- if $h$ is a homomorphism from $\Sigma^\ast$ to some $\Delta^\ast$, the language $h(L)$ is in $\mathcal{S}$;
- if $h$ is a homomorphism from some $\Delta^\ast$ to $\Sigma^\ast$, the language $h^{-1}(L)$ is in $\mathcal{S}$;
- if $R$ is any regular language over $\Sigma$, then $L\cap R$ is in $\mathcal{S}$.

The family of all regular languages is contained in any cone.

If one restricts the definition to homomorphisms that do not introduce the empty word $\lambda$ then one speaks of a faithful cone; the inverse homomorphisms are not restricted. Within the Chomsky hierarchy, the regular languages, the context-free languages, and the recursively enumerable languages are all cones, whereas the context-sensitive languages and the recursive languages are only faithful cones.

== Relation to Transducers ==
A finite state transducer is a finite state automaton that has both input and output. It defines a transduction $T$, mapping a language $L$ over the input alphabet into another language $T(L)$ over the output alphabet. Each of the cone operations (homomorphism, inverse homomorphism, intersection with a regular language) can be implemented using a finite state transducer. And, since finite state transducers are closed under composition, every sequence of cone operations can be performed by a finite state transducer.

Conversely, every finite state transduction $T$ can be decomposed into cone operations. In fact, there exists a normal form for this decomposition, which is commonly known as Nivat's Theorem: Namely, each such $T$ can be effectively decomposed as $T(L) = g(h^{-1}(L) \cap R)$, where $g, h$ are homomorphisms, and $R$ is a regular language depending only on $T$.

Altogether, this means that a family of languages is a cone if and only if it is closed under finite state transductions. This is a very powerful set of operations. For instance one easily writes a (nondeterministic) finite state transducer with alphabet $\{a,b\}$ that removes every second $b$ in words of even length (and does not change words otherwise). Since the context-free languages form a cone, they are closed under this exotic operation.

== See also ==
- Abstract family of languages
