= Computational history =

Computational History (not to be confused with computation history), sometimes also called Histoinformatics, is a multidisciplinary field that studies history through machine learning and other data-driven, computational approaches.

== See also ==
- International Society for Computational Biology
- List of bioinformatics institutions
- List of biological databases
- Bioinformatics
- Biostatistics
- Computational chemistry
- Computational science
- Computer simulation
- Digital Humanities
- Mathematical biology
- Molecular modeling
- Network biology
- Structural genomics
- Synthetic biology
- Systems biology
