= R (complexity) =

Complexity class consisting of all recursive languages

In computational complexity theory, R is the class of decision problems solvable by a Turing machine, which is the set of all recursive languages (also called decidable languages).

== Equivalent formulations ==
R is equivalent to the set of all total computable functions in the sense that:

- a decision problem is in R if and only if its indicator function is computable,
- a total function is computable if and only if its graph is in R.

== Relationship with other classes ==
Since we can decide any problem for which there exists a recogniser and also a co-recogniser by simply interleaving them until one obtains a result, the class is equal to RE ∩ co-RE.
