= Production (computer science) =

Method of symbol substitution

In computer science, a production or production rule is a rewrite rule that replaces some symbols with other symbols. A finite set of productions $P$ is the main component in the specification of a formal grammar (specifically a generative grammar).

In such grammars, a set of productions is a special case of relation on the set of strings $V^{*}$ (where ${}^{*}$ is the Kleene star operator) over a finite set of symbols $V$ called a vocabulary that defines which non-empty strings can be substituted with others. The set of productions is thus a special kind subset

$$P \subset V^* \times V^*$$

and productions are then written in the form $u \to v$ to mean that $(u, v) \in P$ (not to be confused with $\to$ being used as function notation, since there may be multiple rules for the same $u$). Given two subsets $A,B \subset V^*$, productions can be restricted to satisfy $P \subset A \times B$, in which case productions are said to be of the form $A \to B$. Different choices and constructions of $A, B$ lead to different types of grammars. In general, any production of the form

$$u \to \epsilon,$$

where $\epsilon$ is the empty string (sometimes also denoted $\lambda$), is called an erasing rule, while productions that would produce strings out of nowhere, namely of the form

$$\epsilon \to v,$$

are never allowed.

In order to allow the production rules to create meaningful sentences, the vocabulary is partitioned into (disjoint) sets $\Sigma$ and $N$ providing two different roles:

- $\Sigma$ denotes the terminal symbols known as an alphabet containing the symbols allowed in a sentence;
- $N$ denotes nonterminal symbols, containing a distinguished start symbol $S \in N$, that are needed together with the production rules to define how to build the sentences.

In the most general case of an unrestricted grammar, a production $u \to v$, is allowed to map arbitrary strings $u$ and $v$ in $V$ (terminals and nonterminals), as long as $u$ is not empty. So unrestricted grammars have productions of the form

$$V^* \setminus \{\epsilon\} \to V^*$$

or if we want to disallow changing finished sentences

$$V^*NV^* = (V^*\setminus\Sigma^*) \to V^*$$,

where $V^*NV^*$ indicates concatenation and forces a non-terminal symbol to always be present on the left-hand side of the productions, and $\setminus$ denotes set minus or set difference. If we do not allow the start symbol to occur in $v$ (the word on the right side), we have to replace $V^*$ with $(V \setminus \{S\})^*$ on the right-hand side.

The other types of formal grammar in the Chomsky hierarchy impose additional restrictions on what constitutes a production. Notably in a context-free grammar, the left-hand side of a production must be a single nonterminal symbol. So productions are of the form:

$$N \to V^*$$

== Grammar generation ==
To generate a string in the language, one begins with a string consisting of only a single start symbol, and then successively applies the rules (any number of times, in any order) to rewrite this string. This stops when a string containing only terminals is obtained. The language consists of all the strings that can be generated in this manner. Any particular sequence of legal choices taken during this rewriting process yields one particular string in the language. If there are multiple different ways of generating this single string, then the grammar is said to be ambiguous.

For example, assume the alphabet consists of $a$ and $b$, with the start symbol $S$, and we have the following rules:

1. $S \rightarrow aSb$
2. $S \rightarrow ba$

then we start with $S$, and can choose a rule to apply to it. If we choose rule 1, we replace $S$ with $aSb$ and obtain the string $aSb$. If we choose rule 1 again, we replace $S$ with $aSb$ and obtain the string $aaSbb$. This process is repeated until we only have symbols from the alphabet (i.e., $a$ and $b$). If we now choose rule 2, we replace $S$ with $ba$ and obtain the string $aababb$, and are done. We can write this series of choices more briefly, using symbols: $S \Rightarrow aSb \Rightarrow aaSbb \Rightarrow aababb$. The language of the grammar is the set of all the strings that can be generated using this process: $\{ba, abab, aababb, aaababbb, \dotsc\}$.

== See also ==
- Formal grammar
- Finite automata
- Generative grammar
- L-system
- Rewrite rule
- Backus–Naur form (A compact form for writing the productions of a context-free grammar.)
- Phrase structure rule
- Post canonical system (Emil Post's production systems- a model of computation.)
