= Cassius Jackson Keyser =

American mathematician

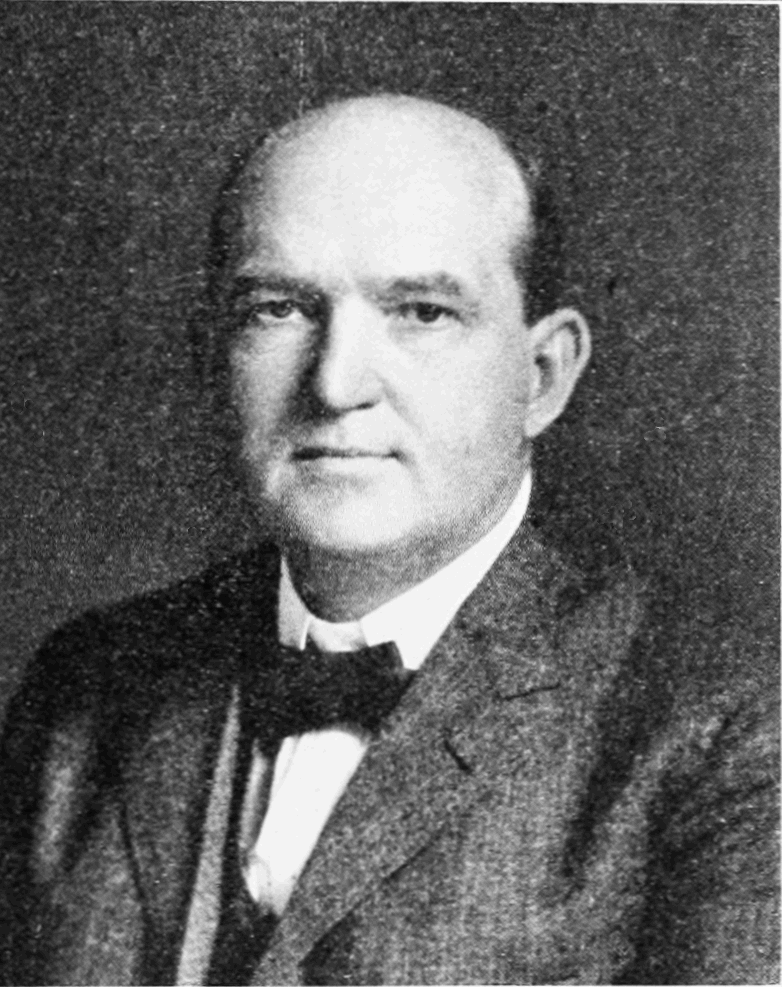
- Born: May 15, 1862; Rawson, Ohio, US
- Died: May 8, 1947 (aged 84); New York City, New York, US
- Education: Ohio Northern University; University of Missouri; Columbia University
- Known for: Foundation of mathematics
- Spouse: Ella Maud Crow
- Scientific career
- Fields: Mathematics
- Workplaces: University of Missouri; State University of New York at New Paltz; Washington University in St. Louis; Columbia University
- Thesis: The Plane Geometry of the Point in Point-Space of Four Dimensions (1901)
- Doctoral students: Eric Temple Bell, Emil Post

Cassius Jackson Keyser (May 15, 1862 – May 8, 1947) was an American mathematician of pronounced philosophical inclinations.

== Life ==
Keyser's initial higher education was at North West Ohio Normal School (now Ohio Northern University), then became a school teacher and principal. In 1885, he married a fellow student at the Normal School, Ella Maud Crow. He completed a second undergraduate degree, a BSc, at the University of Missouri in 1892. After teaching there, at the New York State Normal School (now State University of New York at New Paltz), and at Washington University in St. Louis, he enrolled as a graduate student at Columbia University, earning the MA in 1896 and the PhD in 1901. He spent the rest of his career at Columbia, becoming the Adrian Professor of Mathematics (1904–27) and Head of the department (1910–16). He retired in 1927.

Keyser was one of the first Americans to appreciate the new directions in the foundation of mathematics, heralded by the work of Europeans such as Richard Dedekind, Georg Cantor, Giuseppe Peano, Henri Poincaré, David Hilbert, Ernst Zermelo, Bertrand Russell, and A. N. Whitehead. He was also one of the first to appreciate the mathematical and philosophical importance of his fellow American Charles Sanders Peirce. Alfred Korzybski, founder of general semantics, named Keyser as a major influence. While at Columbia, Keyser supervised only two PhDs, but they both proved quite consequential: Eric Temple Bell and the logician Emil Post.

He became a member of the American board of the Hibbert Journal, and made contributions to that and other philosophical journals. Together with the New International Encyclopedia and his Columbia colleague John Dewey, Keyser helped found the American Association of University Professors (AAUP). He was a fellow of the American Association for the Advancement of Science, and a member of the American Mathematical Society.

== Books ==
- 1914. Science and Religion: The Rational and the Super-Rational.
- 1916. The Human Worth of Rigorous Thinking. Columbia Univ. Press.
- 1922. Mathematical Philosophy, a Study of Fate and Freedom.
- 1927. Mole Philosophy and Other Essays.
- 1932. The Meaning of Mathematics.
- 1935. A glance at some of the ideas of Charles Sanders Peirce.
- 1935. Mathematics and the Question of the Cosmic Mind, with Other Essays.
- 1935. Three great synonyms: Relation, transformation, function.
- 1936. Panthetics.
- 1938. A mathematical prodigy: history and legend.
- 1938. Roger Bacon.
- 1938. Benedict Spinoza.
- 1939. The Role of Mathematics in the tragedy of our modern culture.
- 1941. Charles Sanders Peirce as a pioneer. Internet Archive Eprint. A lecture given on May 18, 1935 at the Galois Institute of Mathematics at Long Island University.
- 1942. Thinking about thinking.
- 1947. Mathematics as a culture clue.
- 1952. The rational and the superrational: studies in thinking.
- 2005. Mathematics. Michigan Historical Reprint Series.
- 2005. Mathematical Philosophy: A Study of Fate and Freedom (Lectures for the Educated Laymen). Michigan Historical Reprint Series.

== See also ==
- American philosophy
- List of American philosophers
