= Boris Kushner (mathematician) =

Russian mathematician, poet, and essayist (1941–2019)

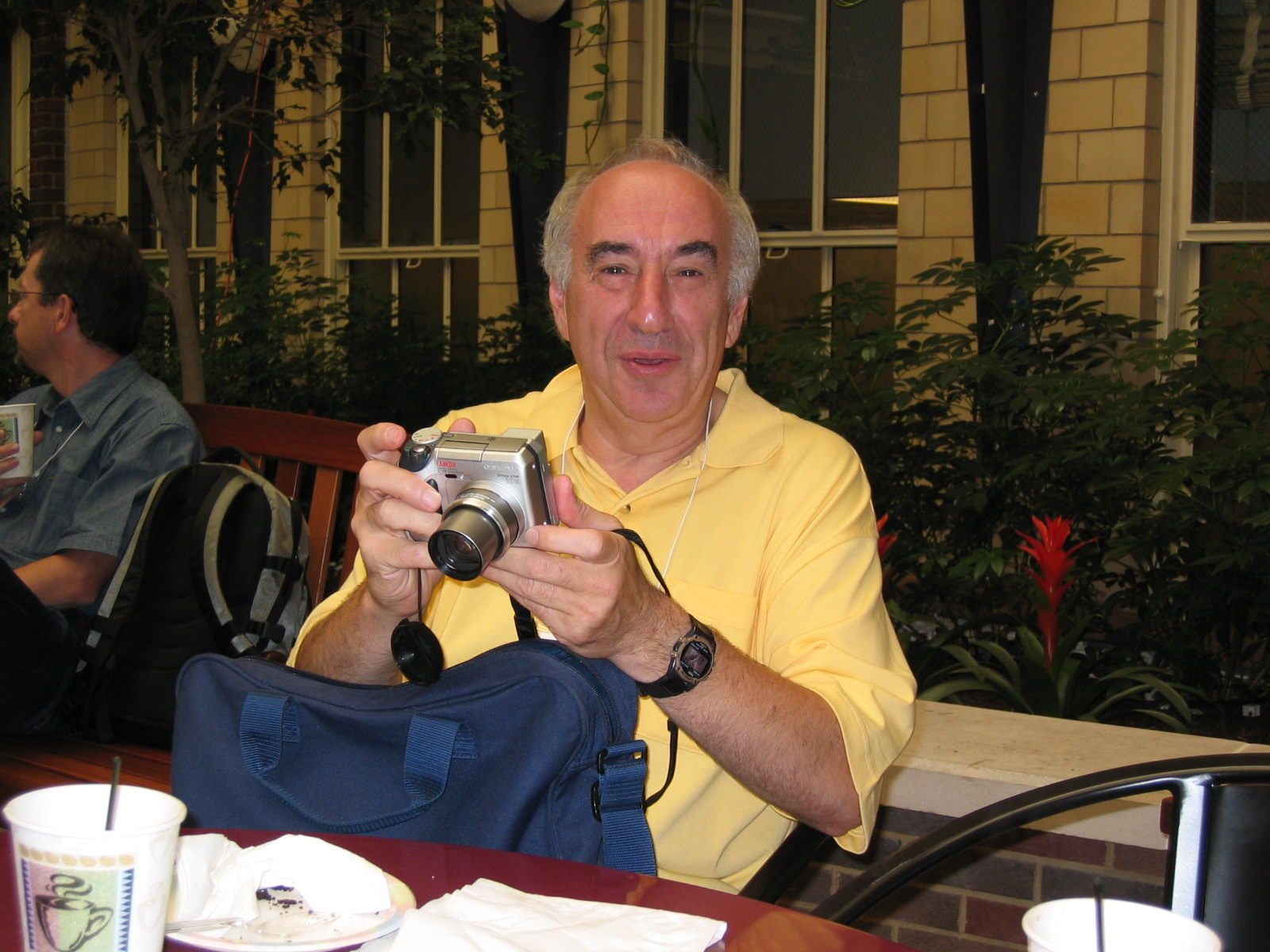
- Kushner in 2003
- Born: Boris Abramovich Kushner; December 10, 1941; Soviet Union
- Died: May 7, 2019 (aged 77); Pittsburgh, Pennsylvania
- Education: Moscow State University
- Occupations: Mathematician, professor

Boris Abramovich Kushner (Russian: Борис Абрамович Кушнер; December 10, 1941 – May 7, 2019) was a mathematician, poet and essayist. His primary contribution in mathematics was in the field of Constructive Mathematical Analysis and the Theory of Constructive Numbers and Functions. He has published several books of poetry (in Russian) and a number of music, literary, and political essays (Russian and English). Dr. Kushner taught at the University of Pittsburgh at Johnstown, Pennsylvania.
