= Recursively enumerable language =

Formal language

In mathematics, logic and computer science, a formal language is called recursively enumerable (also recognizable, partially decidable, semidecidable, Turing-acceptable or Turing-recognizable) if it is a recursively enumerable subset in the set of all possible words over the alphabet of the language, i.e., if there exists a Turing machine which will enumerate all valid strings of the language. These are generated by unrestricted grammars.

Recursively enumerable languages are known as type-0 languages in the Chomsky hierarchy of formal languages. All regular, context-free, context-sensitive and recursive languages are recursively enumerable.

The class of all recursively enumerable languages is called RE.

== Definitions ==
There are three equivalent definitions of a recursively enumerable language:

1. A recursively enumerable language is a recursively enumerable subset in the set of all possible words over the alphabet of the language.
2. A recursively enumerable language is a formal language for which there exists a Turing machine (or other computable function) which will enumerate all valid strings of the language. Note that if the language is infinite, the enumerating algorithm provided can be chosen so that it avoids repetitions, since we can test whether the string produced for number n is "already" produced for a number which is less than n. If it already is produced, use the output for input n+1 instead (recursively), but again, test whether it is "new".
3. A recursively enumerable language is a formal language for which there exists a Turing machine (or other computable function) that will halt and accept when presented with any string in the language as input but may either halt and reject or loop forever when presented with a string not in the language. Contrast this to recursive languages, which require that the Turing machine halts in all cases.

All regular, context-free, context-sensitive and recursive languages are recursively enumerable.

Post's theorem shows that RE, together with its complement co-RE, correspond to the first level of the arithmetical hierarchy.

== Example ==
The set of halting Turing machines is recursively enumerable but not recursive. Indeed, one can run the Turing machine and accept if the machine halts, hence it is recursively enumerable. On the other hand, the problem is undecidable.

Some other recursively enumerable languages that are not recursive include:

- Post correspondence problem
- Mortality (computability theory)
- Entscheidungsproblem

== Closure properties ==
Recursively enumerable languages (REL) are closed under the following operations. That is, if L and P are two recursively enumerable languages, then the following languages are recursively enumerable as well:

- the Kleene star $L^*$ of L
- the concatenation $L \circ P$ of L and P
- the union $L \cup P$
- the intersection $L \cap P$.

Recursively enumerable languages are not closed under set difference or complementation. The set difference $L - P$ is recursively enumerable if $P$ is recursive. If $L$ is recursively enumerable, then the complement of $L$ is recursively enumerable if and only if $L$ is also recursive.

== See also ==
- Computably enumerable set
- Recursion

== Sources ==
- Sipser, Michael (1997). Introduction to the Theory of Computation (1st ed.). PWS Publishing. ISBN 978-0-534-94728-6. (accessible to patrons with print disabilities)
- Kozen, D.C. (1997), Automata and Computability, Springer.
