= Emil Leon Post =

American mathematician and logician (1897 – 1954)

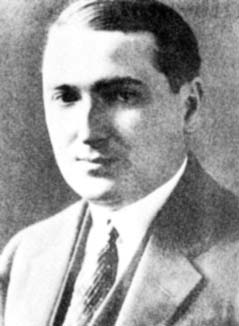
- Born: February 11, 1897; Augustów, Suwałki Governorate, Congress Poland, Russian Empire (now Poland)
- Died: April 21, 1954 (aged 57); New York City, U.S.
- Education: City College of New York (B.S., 1917); Columbia University (A.M. 1918, Ph.D. 1920)
- Known for: Formulation 1 Post correspondence problem Completeness-proof of Principia's propositional calculus Post's inversion formula Post's lattice Post's theorem
- Scientific career
- Fields: Mathematics, logic
- Workplaces: Princeton University
- Thesis: Introduction to a General Theory of Elementary Propositions (1920)
- Doctoral advisor: Cassius Jackson Keyser

Emil Leon Post (/poʊst/; February 11, 1897 – April 21, 1954) was an American mathematician and logician. He is best known for his work in the field that eventually became known as computability theory.

== Life ==
Post was born in Augustów, Suwałki Governorate, Congress Poland, Russian Empire (now Poland) into a Polish-Jewish family that immigrated to New York City in May 1904. His parents were Arnold and Pearl Post.

Post had been interested in astronomy, but at the age of twelve lost his left arm in a car accident. This loss was a significant obstacle to being a professional astronomer, leading to his decision to pursue mathematics rather than astronomy.

Post attended the Townsend Harris High School and continued on to graduate from City College of New York in 1917 with a B.S. in mathematics.

After completing his Ph.D. in mathematics in 1920 at Columbia University, supervised by Cassius Jackson Keyser, he did a post-doctorate at Princeton University in the 1920–1921 academic year. Post then became a high school mathematics teacher in New York City.

Post married Gertrude Singer (1900–1956) in 1929, with whom he had a daughter, Phyllis Post Goodman (1932–1995). Post spent at most three hours a day on research on the advice of his doctor in order to avoid manic attacks, which he had been experiencing since his year at Princeton.

In 1936, he was appointed to the mathematics department at the City College of New York. He died in April 1954 of a heart attack following electroshock treatment for depression.

== Early work ==
In his doctoral thesis, later shortened and published as "Introduction to a General Theory of Elementary Propositions" (1921), Post proved, among other things, that the propositional calculus of Principia Mathematica was complete: all tautologies are theorems, given the Principia axioms and the rules of substitution and modus ponens. Post also devised truth tables independently of C. S. Peirce and Ludwig Wittgenstein and put them to good mathematical use. Jean van Heijenoort's well-known source book on mathematical logic (1966) reprinted Post's classic 1921 article setting out these results.

While at Princeton, Post came very close to discovering the incompleteness of Principia Mathematica, which Kurt Gödel proved in 1931. Post initially failed to publish his ideas as he believed he needed a 'complete analysis' for them to be accepted. As Post said in a postcard to Gödel in 1938:

I would have discovered Gödel's theorem in 1921—if I had been Gödel.

== Recursion theory ==
In 1936, Post developed, independently of Alan Turing, a mathematical model of computation that was essentially equivalent to the Turing machine model. Intending this as the first of a series of models of equivalent power but increasing complexity, he titled his paper Formulation 1. This model is sometimes called "Post's machine" or a Post–Turing machine, but is not to be confused with Post's tag machines or other special kinds of Post canonical system, a computational model using string rewriting and developed by Post in the 1920s but first published in 1943. Post's rewrite technique is now ubiquitous in programming language specification and design, and so with Church's lambda calculus is a salient influence of classical modern logic on practical computing. Post devised a method of 'auxiliary symbols' by which he could canonically represent any Post-generative language, and indeed any computable function or computable set at all.

Correspondence systems were introduced by Post in 1946 to give simple examples of undecidability. He showed that the Post correspondence problem (PCP) of satisfying their constraints is, in general, undecidable. The undecidability of the correspondence problem turned out to be exactly what was needed to obtain undecidability results in the theory of formal languages.

In an influential address to the American Mathematical Society in 1944, he raised the question of the existence of an uncomputable recursively enumerable set whose Turing degree is less than that of the halting problem. This question, which became known as Post's problem, stimulated much research. It was solved in the affirmative in the 1950s by the introduction of the powerful priority method in computability theory.

== Polyadic groups ==
Post made a fundamental and still influential contribution to the theory of polyadic, or n-ary, groups in a long paper published in 1940. His major theorem showed that a polyadic group is the iterated product of elements of a normal subgroup of a group, such that the quotient group is cyclic of order n − 1. He also demonstrated that a polyadic group operation on a set can be expressed in terms of a group operation on the same set. The paper contains many other important results.

== Selected papers ==
- — (1919). "The generalized gamma functions". Annals of Mathematics. Second Series. 20 (3): 202–217. doi:10.2307/1967871. JSTOR 1967871.
- — (1921). "Introduction to a general theory of elementary propositions". American Journal of Mathematics. 43 (3): 163–185. doi:10.2307/2370324. hdl:2027/uiuo.ark:/13960/t9j450f7q. JSTOR 2370324.
- — (1936). "Finite combinatory processes – Formulation 1". Journal of Symbolic Logic. 1 (3): 103–105. doi:10.2307/2269031. JSTOR 2269031. S2CID 40284503.
- — (1940). "Polyadic groups". Transactions of the American Mathematical Society. 48 (2): 208–350. doi:10.2307/1990085. JSTOR 1990085.
- — (1943). "Formal reductions of the general combinatorial decision problem". American Journal of Mathematics. 65 (2): 197–215. doi:10.2307/2371809. JSTOR 2371809.
- — (1944). "Recursively enumerable sets of positive integers and their decision problems". Bulletin of the American Mathematical Society. 50 (5): 284–316. doi:10.1090/s0002-9904-1944-08111-1. Introduces the important concept of many-one reduction.

== See also ==
- Arithmetical hierarchy
- Functional completeness
- List of multiple discoveries
- List of pioneers in computer science
