= Formal grammar =

Structure of a formal language

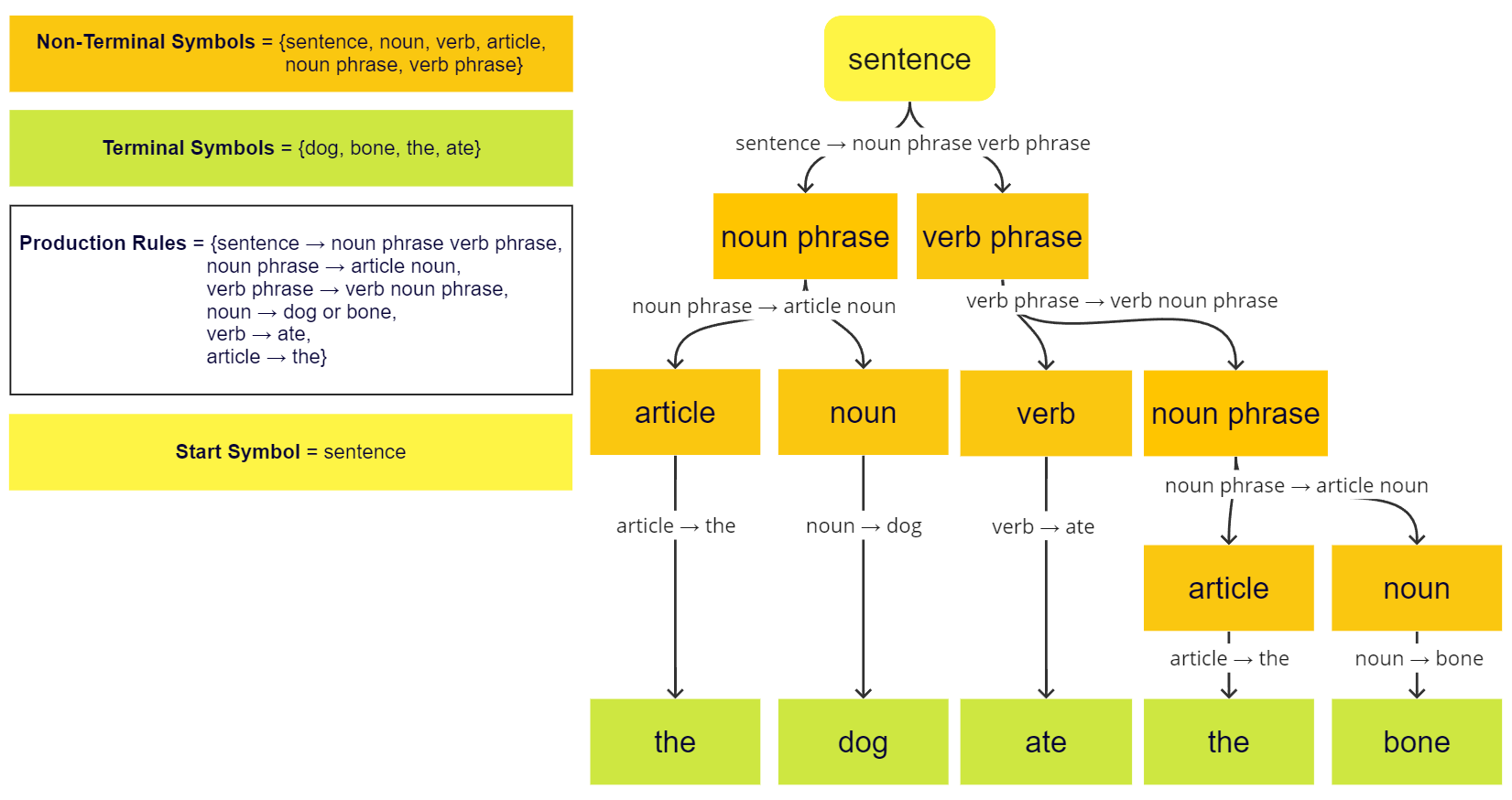
Example of a simple formal grammar (left) with parsed sentence "the dog ate the bone" (right). Formal grammars consist of a set of non-terminal symbols, terminal symbols, production rules, and a designated start symbol.

A formal grammar is a set of symbols and the production rules for rewriting some of them into every possible string of a formal language over an alphabet. A grammar does not describe the meaning of the strings—only their form.

In applied mathematics, formal language theory is the discipline that studies formal grammars and languages. Its applications are found in theoretical computer science, theoretical linguistics, formal semantics, mathematical logic, and other areas.

A formal grammar is a set of rules for rewriting strings, along with a "start symbol" from which rewriting starts. Therefore, a grammar is usually thought of as a language generator. However, it can also be used as the basis for a parser—a function in computing that determines whether a given string belongs to the language or is grammatically incorrect. To describe such parsers, formal language theory uses separate formalisms, known as automata theory. One result of automata theory is that it is not possible to design a recognizer for certain formal languages.

Many languages have the meanings of their strings structured according to their syntax—a practice known as compositional semantics. In these cases, the first step to describing the meaning of a string is to break it down part by part and look at its analyzed form (known as its parse tree in computer science, and as its deep structure in generative grammar).

== Introductory example ==
A grammar mainly consists of a set of production rules, rewrite rules for transforming strings. Each rule specifies a replacement of a particular string (its left-hand side) with another (its right-hand side). A rule can be applied to each string that contains its left-hand side and produces a string in which an occurrence of that left-hand side has been replaced with its right-hand side.

Unlike a semi-Thue system, which is wholly defined by these rules, a grammar further distinguishes between two kinds of symbols: nonterminal and terminal symbols; each left-hand side must contain at least one nonterminal symbol. It also distinguishes a special nonterminal symbol, called the start symbol.

The language generated by the grammar is defined to be the set of all strings without any nonterminal symbols that can be generated from the string consisting of a single start symbol by (possibly repeated) application of its rules in whatever way possible. If there are essentially different ways of generating the same single string, the grammar is said to be ambiguous.

In the following examples, the terminal symbols are a and b, and the start symbol is S.

=== Example 1 ===
Suppose we have the following production rules:

1. $S \rightarrow aSb$
2. $S \rightarrow ba$

then we start with S, and can choose a rule to apply to it. If we choose rule 1, we obtain the string aSb. If we then choose rule 1 again, we replace S with aSb and obtain the string aaSbb. If we now choose rule 2, we replace S with ba and obtain the string aababb, and are done. We can write this series of choices more briefly, using symbols: $S \Rightarrow aSb \Rightarrow aaSbb \Rightarrow aababb$.

The language of the grammar is the infinite set $\{a^nbab^n \mid n \geq 0 \} = \{ba, abab, aababb, aaababbb, \dotsc \}$, where $a^k$ is $a$ repeated $k$ times (and $n$ in particular represents the number of times production rule 1 has been applied). This grammar is context-free (only single nonterminals appear as left-hand sides) and unambiguous.

=== Examples 2 and 3 ===
Suppose the rules are these instead:

1. $S \rightarrow a$
2. $S \rightarrow SS$
3. $aSa \rightarrow b$

This grammar is not context-free due to rule 3 and it is ambiguous due to the multiple ways in which rule 2 can be used to generate sequences of $S$s.

However, the language it generates is simply the set of all nonempty strings consisting of $a$s and/or $b$s. This is easy to see: to generate a $b$ from an $S$, use rule 2 twice to generate $SSS$, then rule 1 twice and rule 3 once to produce $b$. This means we can generate arbitrary nonempty sequences of $S$s and then replace each of them with $a$ or $b$ as we please.

That same language can alternatively be generated by a context-free, nonambiguous grammar; for instance, the regular grammar with rules

1. $S \rightarrow aS$
2. $S \rightarrow bS$
3. $S \rightarrow a$
4. $S \rightarrow b$

== Definition ==
=== The syntax of grammars ===
In the classic formalization of generative grammars first proposed by Noam Chomsky in the 1950s, a grammar G consists of the following components:

- A finite set N of nonterminal symbols.
- A finite set $\Sigma$ of terminal symbols that is disjoint from N.
- A finite set P of production rules, each rule of the form
  $$(\Sigma \cup N)^{*} N (\Sigma \cup N)^{*} \rightarrow (\Sigma \cup N)^{*}$$
  where ${*}$ is the Kleene star operator and $\cup$ denotes set union. That is, each production rule maps from one string of symbols to another, where the first string (the "head") contains an arbitrary number of symbols provided at least one of them is a nonterminal. In the case that the second string (the "body") consists solely of the empty string—i.e., that it contains no symbols at all—it may be denoted with a special notation (often $\Lambda$, e or $\epsilon$) in order to avoid confusion. Such a rule is called an **erasing rule**.
- A distinguished symbol $S \in N$ that is the start symbol, also called the sentence symbol.

A grammar is formally defined as the tuple $(N, \Sigma, P, S)$. Such a formal grammar is often called a rewriting system or a phrase structure grammar in the literature.

=== Some mathematical constructs regarding formal grammars ===
The operation of a grammar can be defined in terms of relations on strings:

- Given a grammar $G = (N, \Sigma, P, S)$, the binary relation $\underset G \Rightarrow$ (pronounced as "G derives in one step") on strings in $(\Sigma \cup N)^{*}$ is defined by:
  $$x \underset G \Rightarrow y \iff \exists u, v, p, q \in (\Sigma \cup N)^*: (x = upv) \wedge (p \rightarrow q \in P) \wedge (y = uqv)$$
- the relation $\overset * {\underset G \Rightarrow}$ (pronounced as G derives in zero or more steps) is defined as the reflexive transitive closure of $\underset G \Rightarrow$
- a **sentential form** is a member of $(\Sigma \cup N)^*$ that can be derived in a finite number of steps from the start symbol $S$; that is, a sentential form is a member of $\left\{ w \in (\Sigma \cup N)^* \mid S \overset * {\underset G \Rightarrow} w \right\}$. A sentential form that contains no nonterminal symbols (i.e. is a member of $\Sigma^*$) is called a sentence.
- the language of $G$, denoted as $\boldsymbol{L}(G)$, is defined as the set of sentences built by $G$.

The grammar $G = (N, \Sigma, P, S)$ is effectively the semi-Thue system $(N \cup \Sigma, P)$, rewriting strings in exactly the same way; the only difference is in that we distinguish specific nonterminal symbols, which must be replaced in rewrite rules, and are only interested in rewritings from the designated start symbol $S$ to strings without nonterminal symbols.

=== Example ===
For these examples, formal languages are specified using set-builder notation.

Consider the grammar $G$ where $N = \left \{S, B\right \}$, $\Sigma = \left \{a, b, c\right \}$, $S$ is the start symbol, and $P$ consists of the following production rules:

1. $S \rightarrow aBSc$
2. $S \rightarrow abc$
3. $Ba \rightarrow aB$
4. $Bb \rightarrow bb$

This grammar defines the language $L(G) = \left \{ a^{n}b^{n}c^{n} \mid n \ge 1 \right \}$ where $a^{n}$ denotes a string of n consecutive $a$'s. Thus, the language is the set of strings that consist of 1 or more $a$'s, followed by the same number of $b$'s, followed by the same number of $c$'s.

Some examples of the derivation of strings in $L(G)$ are:

- $\boldsymbol{S} \underset 2 \Rightarrow \boldsymbol{abc}$
- $$\begin{align} \boldsymbol{S} & \underset 1 \Rightarrow \boldsymbol{aBSc} \\
& \underset 2 \Rightarrow aB\boldsymbol{abc}c \\
& \underset 3 \Rightarrow a\boldsymbol{aB}bcc \\
& \underset 4 \Rightarrow aa\boldsymbol{bb}cc
\end{align}$$
- $$\begin{align}
\boldsymbol{S} & \underset 1 \Rightarrow \boldsymbol{aBSc} \underset 1 \Rightarrow aB\boldsymbol{aBSc}c \\
& \underset 2 \Rightarrow aBaB\boldsymbol{abc}cc \\
& \underset 3 \Rightarrow a\boldsymbol{aB}Babccc \underset 3 \Rightarrow aaB\boldsymbol{aB}bccc \underset 3 \Rightarrow aa\boldsymbol{aB}Bbccc \\
& \underset 4 \Rightarrow aaaB\boldsymbol{bb}ccc \underset 4 \Rightarrow aaa\boldsymbol{bb}bccc \end{align}$$

(On notation: $P \underset i \Rightarrow Q$ reads "String P generates string Q by means of production i", and the generated part is each time indicated in bold type.)

== The Chomsky hierarchy ==
When Noam Chomsky first formalized generative grammars in 1956, he classified them into types now known as the Chomsky hierarchy. The difference between these types is that they have increasingly strict production rules and can therefore express fewer formal languages. Two important types are context-free grammars (Type 2) and regular grammars (Type 3). The languages that can be described with such a grammar are called context-free languages and regular languages, respectively. Although much less powerful than unrestricted grammars (Type 0), which can in fact express any language that can be accepted by a Turing machine, these two restricted types of grammars are most often used because parsers for them can be efficiently implemented. For example, all regular languages can be recognized by a finite-state machine, and for useful subsets of context-free grammars there are well-known algorithms to generate efficient LL parsers and LR parsers to recognize the corresponding languages those grammars generate.

=== Context-free grammars ===
A context-free grammar is a grammar in which the left-hand side of each production rule consists of only a single nonterminal symbol. This restriction is non-trivial; not all languages can be generated by context-free grammars. Those that can are called context-free languages.

The language $L(G) = \left \{ a^{n}b^{n}c^{n} \mid n \ge 1 \right \}$ defined above is not a context-free language, and this can be strictly proven using the pumping lemma for context-free languages, but for example the language $\left \{ a^{n}b^{n} \mid n \ge 1 \right \}$ (at least 1 $a$ followed by the same number of $b$'s) is context-free, as it can be defined by the grammar $G_2$ with $N=\left \{S\right \}$, $\Sigma=\left \{a,b\right \}$, $S$ the start symbol, and the following production rules:

1. $S \rightarrow aSb$
2. $S \rightarrow ab$

A context-free language can be recognized in $O(n^3)$ time (see Big O notation) by an algorithm such as Earley's recogniser and in a sub-cubic time by fast matrix multiplication algorithms. That is, for every context-free language, a machine can be built that takes a string as input and determines in $O(n^3)$ time whether the string is a member of the language, where $n$ is the length of the string. Deterministic context-free languages is a subset of context-free languages that can be recognized in linear time. There exist various algorithms that target either this set of languages or some subset of it.

=== Regular grammars ===
In regular grammars, the left hand side is again only a single nonterminal symbol, but now the right-hand side is also restricted. The right side may be the empty string, or a single terminal symbol, or a single terminal symbol followed by a nonterminal symbol, but nothing else. (Sometimes a broader definition is used: one can allow longer strings of terminals or single nonterminals without anything else, making languages easier to denote while still defining the same class of languages.)

The language $\left \{ a^{n}b^{n} \mid n \ge 1 \right \}$ defined above is not regular, but the language $\left \{ a^{n}b^{m} \mid m,n \ge 1 \right \}$ (at least 1 $a$ followed by at least 1 $b$, where the numbers may be different) is, as it can be defined by the grammar $G_3$ with $N=\left \{S, A,B\right \}$, $\Sigma=\left \{a,b\right \}$, $S$ the start symbol, and the following production rules:

1. $S \rightarrow aA$
2. $A \rightarrow aA$
3. $A \rightarrow bB$
4. $B \rightarrow bB$
5. $B \rightarrow \epsilon$

All languages generated by a regular grammar can be recognized in $O(n)$ time by a finite-state machine. Although in practice, regular grammars are commonly expressed using regular expressions, some forms of regular expression used in practice do not strictly generate the regular languages and do not show linear recognitional performance due to those deviations.

=== Other forms of generative grammars ===
Many extensions and variations on Chomsky's original hierarchy of formal grammars have been developed, both by linguists and by computer scientists, usually either in order to increase their expressive power or in order to make them easier to analyze or parse. Some forms of grammars developed include:

- Tree-adjoining grammars increase the expressiveness of conventional generative grammars by allowing rewrite rules to operate on parse trees instead of just strings.
- Affix grammars and attribute grammars allow rewrite rules to be augmented with semantic attributes and operations, useful both for increasing grammar expressiveness and for constructing practical language translation tools.

=== Recursive grammars ===
A recursive grammar is a grammar that contains production rules that are recursive. For example, a grammar for a context-free language is left-recursive if there exists a non-terminal symbol A that can be put through the production rules to produce a string with A as the leftmost symbol. An example of recursive grammar is a clause within a sentence separated by two commas. All types of grammars in the Chomsky hierarchy can be recursive.

== Analytic grammars ==
Though there is a tremendous body of literature on parsing algorithms, most of these algorithms assume that the language to be parsed is initially described by means of a generative formal grammar, and that the goal is to transform this generative grammar into a working parser. Strictly speaking, a generative grammar does not in any way correspond to the algorithm used to parse a language, and various algorithms have different restrictions on the form of production rules that are considered well-formed.

An alternative approach is to formalize the language in terms of an analytic grammar in the first place, which more directly corresponds to the structure and semantics of a parser for the language. Examples of analytic grammar formalisms include the following:

- Top-down parsing language (TDPL): a highly minimalist analytic grammar formalism developed in the early 1970s to study the behavior of top-down parsers.
- Link grammars: a form of analytic grammar designed for linguistics, which derives syntactic structure by examining the positional relationships between pairs of words.
- Parsing expression grammars (PEGs): a more recent generalization of TDPL designed around the practical expressiveness needs of programming language and compiler writers.

== Model-theoretic grammars ==
Model-theoretic grammars, also known as constraint-based grammars, contrast with generative grammars in the way they define sets of sentences: they state constraints on syntactic structure rather than providing operations for generating syntactic objects. A generative grammar provides a set of operations such as rewriting, insertion, deletion, movement, or combination, and is interpreted as a definition of the set of all and only the objects that these operations are capable of producing through iterative application. A model-theoretic grammar simply states a set of conditions that an object must meet, and can be regarded as defining the set of all and only the structures of a certain sort that satisfy all of the constraints. The approach applies the mathematical techniques of model theory to the task of syntactic description: a grammar is a theory in the logician's sense (a consistent set of statements) and the well-formed structures are the models that satisfy the theory.

== See also ==
- Abstract syntax tree
- Adaptive grammar
- Ambiguous grammar
- Backus–Naur form (BNF)
- Categorial grammar
- Concrete syntax tree
- Extended Backus–Naur form (EBNF)
- Grammar
- Grammar framework
- L-system
- Lojban
- Post canonical system
- Shape grammar
- Well-formed formula
