= Markov algorithm =

Algorithm operating on grammar-like rules

In theoretical computer science, a Markov algorithm is a string rewriting system that uses grammar-like rules to operate on strings of symbols. Markov algorithms have been shown to be Turing-complete, which means that they are suitable as a general model of computation and can represent any mathematical expression from its simple notation. Markov algorithms are named after the Soviet mathematician Andrey Markov, Jr.

Refal is a programming language based on Markov algorithms.

== Description ==
Normal algorithms are verbal, that is, intended to be applied to strings in different alphabets.

The definition of any normal algorithm consists of two parts: an alphabet, which is a set of symbols, and a scheme. The algorithm is applied to strings of symbols of the alphabet. The scheme is a finite ordered set of substitution formulas. Each formula can be either simple or final. Simple substitution formulas are represented by strings of the form $L\to D$, where $L$ and $D$ are two arbitrary strings in the alphabet. Similarly, final substitution formulas are represented by strings of the form $L\to\cdot D$.

Here is an example of a normal algorithm scheme in the five-letter alphabet $|*abc$:

$$\left\{\begin{matrix} |b&\to& ba|\\ ab&\to& ba\\ b&\to&\\ {*}|&\to& b*& \\ {*}&\to& c& \\
|c&\to& c\\ ac&\to& c|\\ c&\to\cdot\end{matrix}\right.$$

The process of applying the normal algorithm to an arbitrary string $V$ in the alphabet of this algorithm is a discrete sequence of elementary steps, consisting of the following. Let’s assume that $V'$ is the word obtained in the previous step of the algorithm (or the original word $V$, if the current step is the first). If of the substitution formulas there is no left-hand side which is included in the $V'$, then the algorithm terminates, and the result of its work is considered to be the string $V'$. Otherwise, the first of the substitution formulae whose left sides are included in $V'$ is selected. If the substitution formula is of the form $L\to\cdot D$, then out of all of possible representations of the string $V'$ of the form $RLS$ (where $R$ and $S$ are arbitrary strings) the one with the shortest $R$ is chosen. Then the algorithm terminates and the result of its work is considered to be $RDS$. However, if this substitution formula is of the form $L\to D$, then out of all of the possible representations of the string $V'$ of the form of $RLS$ the one with the shortest $R$ is chosen, after which the string $RDS$ is considered to be the result of the current step, subject to further processing in the next step.

For example, the process of applying the algorithm described above to the word $|*||$ results in the sequence of words $|b*|$, $ba|*|$, $a|*|$, $a|b*$, $aba|*$, $baa|*$, $aa|*$, $aa|c$, $aac$, $ac|$ and $c||$, after which the algorithm stops with the result $||$.

For other examples, see below.

Any normal algorithm is equivalent to some Turing machine, and vice versa – any Turing machine is equivalent to some normal algorithm. A version of the Church–Turing thesis formulated in relation to the normal algorithm is called the "principle of normalization."

Normal algorithms have proved to be a convenient means for the construction of many sections of constructive mathematics. Moreover, inherent in the definition of a normal algorithm are a number of ideas used in programming languages aimed at handling symbolic information – for example, in Refal.

== Algorithm ==
The Rules are a sequence of pairs of strings, usually presented in the form of pattern → replacement. Each rule may be either ordinary or terminating.

Given an input string:

1. Check the Rules in order from top to bottom to see whether any of the patterns can be found in the input string.
2. If none is found, the algorithm stops.
3. If one (or more) is found, use the first of them to replace the leftmost occurrence of matched text in the input string with its replacement.
4. If the rule just applied was a terminating one, the algorithm stops.
5. Go to step 1.

Note that after each rule application the search starts over from the first rule.

== Example ==
The following example shows the basic operation of a Markov algorithm.

=== Rules ===
1. "A" -> "apple"
2. "B" -> "bag"
3. "S" -> "shop"
4. "T" -> "the"
5. "the shop" -> "my brother"
6. "a never used" -> ."terminating rule"

=== Symbol string ===
"I bought a B of As from T S."

=== Execution ===
If the algorithm is applied to the above example, the Symbol string will change in the following manner.

1. "I bought a B of As from T S."
2. "I bought a B of apples from T S."
3. "I bought a bag of apples from T S."
4. "I bought a bag of apples from T shop."
5. "I bought a bag of apples from the shop."
6. "I bought a bag of apples from my brother."

The algorithm will then terminate.

== Another example ==
These rules give a more interesting example. They rewrite binary numbers to their unary counterparts. For example, 101 will be rewritten to a string of 5 consecutive bars.

=== Rules ===
1. "|0" -> "0||"
2. "1" -> "0|"
3. "0" -> ""

=== Symbol string ===
"101"

=== Execution ===
If the algorithm is applied to the above example, it will terminate after the following steps.

1. "101"
2. "0|01"
3. "00||1"
4. "00||0|"
5. "00|0|||"
6. "000|||||"
7. "00|||||"
8. "0|||||"
9. "|||||"

== See also ==
- Formal grammar
