= Outline of combinatorics =

Overview of and topical guide to combinatorics

Combinatorics is a branch of mathematics concerning the study of finite or countable discrete structures.

== Essence of combinatorics ==
- Matroid
- Greedoid
- Ramsey theory
  - Van der Waerden's theorem
  - Hales–Jewett theorem
  - Umbral calculus, binomial type polynomial sequences
- Combinatorial species

== Branches of combinatorics ==
- Algebraic combinatorics
- Analytic combinatorics
- Arithmetic combinatorics
- Combinatorics on words
- Combinatorial design theory
- Enumerative combinatorics
- Extremal combinatorics
- Geometric combinatorics
- Graph theory
- Infinitary combinatorics
- Matroid theory
- Order theory
- Partition theory
- Probabilistic combinatorics
- Topological combinatorics

=== Multi-disciplinary fields that include combinatorics ===
- Coding theory
- Combinatorial optimization
- Combinatorics and dynamical systems
- Combinatorics and physics
- Discrete geometry
- Finite geometry
- Phylogenetics

== History of combinatorics ==
History of combinatorics

== General combinatorial principles and methods ==
- Combinatorial principles
- Trial and error, brute-force search, bogosort, British Museum algorithm
- Pigeonhole principle
- Method of distinguished element
- Mathematical induction
- Recurrence relation, telescoping series
- Generating functions as an application of formal power series
  - Cyclic sieving
  - Schrödinger method
  - Exponential generating function
  - Stanley's reciprocity theorem
- Binomial coefficients and their properties
- Combinatorial proof
  - Double counting (proof technique)
  - Bijective proof
- Inclusion–exclusion principle
- Möbius inversion formula
- Parity, even and odd permutations
- Combinatorial Nullstellensatz
- Incidence algebra
- Greedy algorithm
- Divide and conquer algorithm
  - Akra–Bazzi method
- Dynamic programming
- Branch and bound
- Birthday attack, birthday paradox
- Floyd's cycle-finding algorithm
- Reduction to linear algebra
- Sparsity
- Weight function
- Minimax algorithm
  - Alpha–beta pruning
- Probabilistic method
- Sieve methods
- Analytic combinatorics
- Symbolic combinatorics
- Combinatorial class
- Exponential formula
- Twelvefold way
- MacMahon Master theorem

== Data structure concepts ==
- Data structure
  - Data type
  - Abstract data type
  - Algebraic data type
  - Composite type
- Array
- Associative array
- Deque
- List
  - Linked list
- Queue
  - Priority queue
- Skip list
- Stack
- Tree data structure
- Automatic garbage collection

== Problem solving as an art ==
- Heuristic
- Inductive reasoning
- How to Solve It
- Creative problem solving
- Morphological analysis (problem-solving)

== Living with large numbers ==
- Names of large numbers, long scale
- History of large numbers
- Graham's number
- Moser's number
- Skewes' number
- Large number notations
  - Conway chained arrow notation
  - Hyper4
  - Knuth's up-arrow notation
  - Moser polygon notation
  - Steinhaus polygon notation
- Large number effects
  - Exponential growth
  - Combinatorial explosion
  - Branching factor
  - Granularity
  - Curse of dimensionality
  - Concentration of measure

== People in combinatorics ==
- Noga Alon
- George Andrews
- József Beck
- Eric Temple Bell
- Claude Berge
- Béla Bollobás
- Peter Cameron
- Louis Comtet
- John Horton Conway
  - On Numbers and Games
  - Winning Ways for your Mathematical Plays
- Persi Diaconis
- Ada Dietz
- Paul Erdős
  - Erdős conjecture
- Philippe Flajolet
- Solomon Golomb
- Ron Graham
- Ben Green
- Tim Gowers
- Jeff Kahn
- Gil Kalai
- Gyula O. H. Katona
- Daniel J. Kleitman
- Imre Leader
- László Lovász
- Fedor Petrov
- George Pólya
- Vojtěch Rödl
- Gian-Carlo Rota
- Cecil C. Rousseau
- H. J. Ryser
- Dick Schelp
- Vera T. Sós
- Joel Spencer
- Emanuel Sperner
- Richard P. Stanley
- Benny Sudakov
- Endre Szemerédi
- Terence Tao
- Carsten Thomassen
- Jacques Touchard
- Pál Turán
- Bartel Leendert van der Waerden
- Herbert Wilf
- Richard Wilson
- Doron Zeilberger

=== Combinatorics scholars ===
- Category:Combinatorialists

== Journals ==
- Advances in Combinatorics
- Annals of Combinatorics
- Ars Combinatoria
- Australasian Journal of Combinatorics
- Bulletin of the Institute of Combinatorics and Its Applications
- Combinatorica
- Combinatorics, Probability and Computing
- Computational Complexity
- Designs, Codes and Cryptography
- Discrete Analysis
- Discrete & Computational Geometry
- Discrete Applied Mathematics
- Discrete Mathematics
- Discrete Mathematics & Theoretical Computer Science
- Discrete Optimization
- Discussiones Mathematicae Graph Theory
- Electronic Journal of Combinatorics
- European Journal of Combinatorics
- The Fibonacci Quarterly
- Finite Fields and Their Applications
- Geombinatorics
- Graphs and Combinatorics
- Integers, Electronic Journal of Combinatorial Number Theory
- Journal of Algebraic Combinatorics
- Journal of Automata, Languages and Combinatorics
- Journal of Combinatorial Designs
- Journal of Combinatorial Mathematics and Combinatorial Computing
- Journal of Combinatorial Optimization
- Journal of Combinatorial Theory, Series A
- Journal of Combinatorial Theory, Series B
- Journal of Complexity
- Journal of Cryptology
- Journal of Graph Algorithms and Applications
- Journal of Graph Theory
- Journal of Integer Sequences (Electronic)
- Journal of Mathematical Chemistry
- Online Journal of Analytic Combinatorics
- Optimization Methods and Software
- The Ramanujan Journal
- Séminaire Lotharingien de Combinatoire
- SIAM Journal on Discrete Mathematics

== Prizes ==
- Euler Medal
- European Prize in Combinatorics
- Fulkerson Prize
- König Prize
- Pólya Prize

== See also ==
- List of factorial and binomial topics
- List of partition topics
- List of permutation topics
- List of puzzle topics.
- List of formal language and literal string topics
