= List of things named after Erwin Schrödinger =

This is a list of things named after the Austrian theoretical physicist Erwin Schrödinger.

== Quantum physics ==
- Einstein–Schrödinger equation, see Wheeler–DeWitt equation
- Schrödinger's cat, a thought experiment devised by Schrödinger that illustrates what he saw as the problem of the Copenhagen interpretation of quantum mechanics applied to everyday objects
- Schrödinger equation, an equation formulated by Schrödinger that describes how the quantum state of a physical system changes in time
  - Schrödinger–Pauli equation
- Schrödinger field, a quantum field which obeys the Schrödinger equation
- Schrödinger–HJW theorem, a result about density matrices
- Schrödinger method, a method used to solve some problems of distribution and occupancy
- Schrödinger operator, see Hamiltonian (quantum mechanics)
- Schrödinger paradox, the paradox that living systems increase their organization despite the second law of thermodynamics
- Schrödinger picture, a formulation of quantum mechanics in which the state vectors evolve in time, but the operators (observables and others) are constant
- Schrödinger's pure-affine theory
- Schrödinger–Newton equation
- Rayleigh–Schrödinger perturbation theory
- Robertson–Schrödinger relation

=== Related mathematical concepts and equations ===
- Logarithmic Schrödinger equation
- Nonlinear Schrödinger equation
- Schrödinger functional
- Schrödinger group, the symmetry group of the free particle Schrödinger equation

== Astronomy ==
- Schrödinger (crater), a lunar impact crater
- Vallis Schrödinger, a long, nearly linear valley that lies on the far side of the Moon
- 13092 Schrödinger, a main belt asteroid

== Other ==
- Schrödinger logic
- The Erwin Schrödinger International Institute for Mathematical Physics
- Erwin Schrödinger Prize of the Austrian Academy of Sciences (1956)
- Schrödinger Medal
- Schrödinbugs, a type of software bugs, related to Heisenbugs, that manifest themselves in running software only after a programmer notices that the code should never have worked in the first place.
- "Schrödinger" – A Dirac codec implementation developed by David Schleef.
- Schrödinger (company), a scientific software company
- Schrödinger (Hellsing), a fictional character in the Hellsing manga series by Kouta Hirano

=== Popular culture ===
- Schrödinger's Cat trilogy

== See also ==
- Schrödinger (disambiguation)
