= Schrödinger (disambiguation) =

Erwin Schrödinger (1887–1961) was an Austrian physicist and one of the fathers of quantum mechanics.

Schrödinger may also refer to:

== Physics ==
- Schrödinger's cat, a thought experiment devised by Schrödinger that illustrates what he saw as the problem of the Copenhagen interpretation of quantum mechanics applied to everyday objects
- Schrödinger equation, an equation formulated by Schrödinger that describes how the quantum state of a physical system changes in time
- Schrödinger field, a quantum field which obeys the Schrödinger equation
- Schrödinger group, the symmetry group of the free particle Schrödinger equation
- Schrödinger method, a method used to solve some problems of distribution and occupancy
- Schrödinger picture, a formulation of quantum mechanics in which the state vectors evolve in time, but the operators (observables and others) are constant

== Astronomy ==
- Schrödinger (crater), a lunar impact crater
- Vallis Schrödinger, a long, nearly linear valley that lies on the far side of the Moon
- 13092 Schrödinger, a main belt asteroid

== Other ==
- Schrödinger, an implementation of Dirac (video compression format)
- Schrödinger (company), a scientific software company
- Schrödinger (Hellsing), a fictional character in the Hellsing manga series by Kouta Hirano
