= List of formal language and literal string topics =

This is a list of formal language and literal string topics, by Wikipedia page.

== Formal languages ==
- Abstract syntax tree
- Backus-Naur form
- Categorial grammar
- Chomsky hierarchy
- Concatenation
- Context-free grammar
- Context-sensitive grammar
- Context-sensitive language
- Decidable language
- ECLR-attributed grammar
- Finite language
- Formal grammar
- Formal language
- Formal system
- Generalized star height problem
- Kleene algebra
- Kleene star
- L-attributed grammar
- LR-attributed grammar
- Myhill–Nerode theorem
- Parsing expression grammar
- Prefix grammar
- Pumping lemma
- Recursively enumerable language
- Regular expression
- Regular grammar
- Regular language
- S-attributed grammar
- Star height
- Star height problem
- Syntactic monoid
- Syntax (logic)
- Tree-adjoining grammar

== Literal strings ==
- Anagram
- Case sensitivity
- Infinite monkey theorem
- Lexical analysis
  - Lexeme
  - Lexicography
  - Lexicon
- Lipogram
- The Library of Babel
- Palindrome
- Pangram
- Sequence alignment

== Classical cryptography ==
- Atbash cipher
- Autokey cipher
- Bazeries cylinder
- Bible code
- Bifid cipher
- Caesar cipher
- Cardan grille
- Enigma machine
- Frequency analysis
- Index of coincidence
- Playfair cipher
- Polyalphabetic substitution
- Polybius square
- ROT13, ROT47
- Scytale
- Steganography
- Substitution cipher
- Tabula recta
- Transposition cipher
- Vigenère cipher
