= LR-attributed grammar =

LR-attributed grammars are a special type of attribute grammars. They allow the attributes to be evaluated on LR parsing. As a result, attribute evaluation in LR-attributed grammars can be incorporated conveniently in bottom-up parsing. zyacc is based on LR-attributed grammars. They are a subset of the L-attributed grammars, where the attributes can be evaluated in one left-to-right traversal of the abstract syntax tree. They are a superset of the S-attributed grammars, which allow only synthesized attributes. In yacc, a common hack is to use global variables to simulate some kind of inherited attributes and thus LR-attribution.

== ECLR-attributed grammar ==
ECLR-attributed grammars are a special type of attribute grammars.

They are a variant of LR-attributed grammars where an equivalence relation on inherited attributes is used to optimize attribute evaluation. EC stands for equivalence class. The compiler generator Rie (first developed 1985) was based on ECLR-attributed grammars.
