= Sequential system =

A sequential system may refer to:

- Sequential medium in in vitro fertilization
- Sequential dynamical system
