= Case analysis =

Case analysis may refer to

- Proof by cases in mathematics
- Case study, detailed examination of a subject
- The case method used in teaching
