= Extended affix grammar =

Formal grammar formalism

In computer science, extended affix grammars (EAGs) are a formal grammar formalism for describing the context free and context sensitive syntax of language, both natural language and programming languages.

EAGs are a member of the family of two-level grammars; more specifically, a restriction of Van Wijngaarden grammars with the specific purpose of making parsing feasible.

Like Van Wijngaarden grammars, EAGs have hyperrules that form a context-free grammar except in that their nonterminals may have arguments, known as affixes, the possible values of which are supplied by another context-free grammar, the metarules.

EAGs were introduced and studied by D.A. Watt in 1974; recognizers were developed at the University of Nijmegen between 1985 and 1995. The EAG compiler developed there will generate either a recogniser, a transducer, a translator, or a syntax directed editor for a language described in the EAG formalism. The formalism is quite similar to Prolog, to the extent that it borrowed its cut operator.

EAGs have been used to write grammars of natural languages such as English, Spanish, and Hungarian. The aim was to verify the grammars by making them parse corpora of text (corpus linguistics); hence, parsing had to be sufficiently practical. However, the parse tree explosion problem that ambiguities in natural language tend to produce in this type of approach is worsened for EAGs because each choice of affix value may produce a separate parse, even when several different values are equivalent. The remedy proposed was to switch to the much simpler Affix Grammar over a Finite Lattice (AGFL) instead, in which metagrammars can only produce simple finite languages.

== See also ==
- Affix grammar
- Corpus linguistics
