= British Museum (disambiguation) =

The British Museum is a museum of human culture and history located in Bloomsbury, London.

British Museum may also refer to:

- British Museum (Natural History), former name of the Natural History Museum, London, used until 1992
- British Museum tube station, London Underground station that closed in 1933

== See also ==
- The British Museum Is Falling Down, 1965 novel by David Lodge
- The British Museum Friends, charitable organisation
- British Museum algorithm, finding the correct answer by trying all possibilities
- Category:Lists of museums in the United Kingdom
