= Proof by exhaustion =

Type of mathematical proof

Proof by exhaustion, also known as proof by cases, proof by case analysis, complete induction or the brute force method, is a method of mathematical proof in which a statement is established by dividing the argument into several distinct cases and proving that the statement holds in each case. The cases must be collectively exhaustive, ensuring that all possible situations are considered.

The prevalence of digital computers has greatly increased the convenience of using the method of exhaustion (e.g., the first computer-assisted proof of four color theorem in 1976), though such approaches can also be challenged on the basis of mathematical elegance. Expert systems can be used to arrive at answers to many of the questions posed to them. In theory, the proof by exhaustion method can be used whenever the number of cases is finite. However, because most mathematical sets are infinite, this method is rarely used to derive general mathematical results.

== General structure ==
A proof by cases typically follows these steps:

1. Identify all possible cases that exhaust all possibilities.
2. Prove the statement for the first case.
3. Prove the statement for each remaining case.
4. Conclude that if all cases have been proven correct, the statement holds. If one of the cases disproves the statement, it does not hold.

== Usage ==
Proof by cases is commonly used when a problem naturally separates into distinct categories, such as:

- Even and odd integers
- Positive, negative and zero values
- Different intervals of a function

This argument is especially useful when a single argument cannot easily address all possible situations at once.

== Examples ==
Prove that for any integer n, the number n^{2} is even if n is even, and n^{2} is odd if n is odd.

Proof:

Consider two cases:

Case 1

- n is even
- Then n = 2k for some integer k
- Then n^{2} = (2k)^{2} = 4k^{2} = 2(2k^{2}), which is even

Case 2

- n is odd
- Then n = 2k + 1 for some integer k
- Then n^{2} = (2k + 1)^{2} = 4k^{2} + 4k + 1 = 2(2k^{2} + 2k) + 1, which is odd

Since both cases have been proven, the statement holds for all integers n.

Prove that if an integer is a perfect cube, then it must be either a multiple of 9, 1 more than a multiple of 9, or 1 less than a multiple of 9.

Proof:
Each perfect cube is the cube of some integer n, where n is either a multiple of 3, 1 more than a multiple of 3, or 1 less than a multiple of 3. So these three cases are exhaustive:

- Case 1: If n = 3p, then n^{3} = 27p^{3}, which is a multiple of 9.
- Case 2: If n = 3p + 1, then n^{3} = 27p^{3} + 27p^{2} + 9p + 1, which is 1 more than a multiple of 9. For instance, if n = 4 then n^{3} = 64 = 9×7 + 1.
- Case 3: If n = 3p − 1, then n^{3} = 27p^{3} − 27p^{2} + 9p − 1, which is 1 less than a multiple of 9. For instance, if n = 5 then n^{3} = 125 = 9×14 − 1. Q.E.D.

== Elegance ==
Mathematicians prefer to avoid proofs by exhaustion with large numbers of cases, which are viewed as inelegant. Mathematical elegance can be defined as a subjective judgment of a mathematical proof based on its simplicity and effectiveness. It is often portrayed in finding the simplest manner to express a complex concept. A major reason as to why this is seen as mathematically inelegant is because this method is best used in scenarios with a finite number of outcomes. Scenarios with a large, or infinite, amount of outcomes would be much more difficult to prove with this method. An illustration as to how such proofs might be inelegant is to look at the following proofs that all modern Summer Olympic Games are held in years which are divisible by 4:

Proof: The first modern Summer Olympics were held in 1896, and then every 4 years thereafter (neglecting exceptional situations such as when the games' schedule was disrupted by World War I, World War II and the COVID-19 pandemic). Since 1896 = 474 × 4 is divisible by 4, the next Olympics would be in year 474 × 4 + 4 = (474 + 1) × 4, which is also divisible by four, and so on (this is a proof by mathematical induction). Therefore, the statement is proved.

The statement can also be proved by exhaustion by listing out every year in which the Summer Olympics were held, and checking that every one of them can be divided by four. With 28 total Summer Olympics as of 2016, this is a proof by exhaustion with 28 cases.

In addition to being less elegant, the proof by exhaustion will also require an extra case each time a new Summer Olympics is held. This is to be contrasted with the proof by mathematical induction, which proves the statement indefinitely into the future.

== Number of cases ==
There is no upper limit to the number of cases allowed in a proof by exhaustion. Sometimes there are only two or three cases, but there may be thousands or even millions. For example, rigorously solving a chess endgame puzzle might involve considering a very large number of possible positions in the game tree of that problem.

The first proof of the four colour theorem was a proof by exhaustion with 1834 cases. This proof was controversial because the majority of the cases were checked by a computer program, not by hand. The shortest known proof of the four colour theorem today still has over 600 cases.

In general the probability of an error in the whole proof increases with the number of cases. A proof with a large number of cases leaves an impression that the theorem is only true by coincidence, and not because of some underlying principle or connection. Other types of proofs—such as proof by induction (mathematical induction)—are considered more elegant. However, there are some important theorems for which no other method of proof has been found, such as

- The proof that there is no finite projective plane of order 10.
- The classification of finite simple groups.
- The Kepler conjecture.
- The Boolean Pythagorean triples problem.

== See also ==
- British Museum algorithm
- Computer-assisted proof
- Enumerative induction
- Mathematical induction
- Proof by contradiction
- Disjunction elimination
