= Combinatorics and dynamical systems =

The mathematical disciplines of combinatorics and dynamical systems interact in a number of ways, labeled as Combinatorial Dynamics. The ergodic theory of dynamical systems has recently been used to prove combinatorial theorems about number theory which has given rise to the field of arithmetic combinatorics. Also dynamical systems theory is heavily involved in the relatively recent field of combinatorics on words. Also combinatorial aspects of dynamical systems are studied. Dynamical systems can be defined on combinatorial objects; see for example graph dynamical system.

== See also ==
- Symbolic dynamics
- Analytic combinatorics
- Combinatorics and physics
- Arithmetic dynamics
