= Affix grammar over a finite lattice =

Notation for context-free grammars with finite set-valued features

Affix grammars over a finite lattice (AGFL) is a restricted type of affix grammar in which affixes can only assume finite sets of values. It is aimed at natural language processing and other applications in linguistics.

Some applications have been published.

The AGFL project developed AGFL-based technology and made it available under the GNU GPL.
