= Sequential dynamical system =

Class of graph dynamical systems

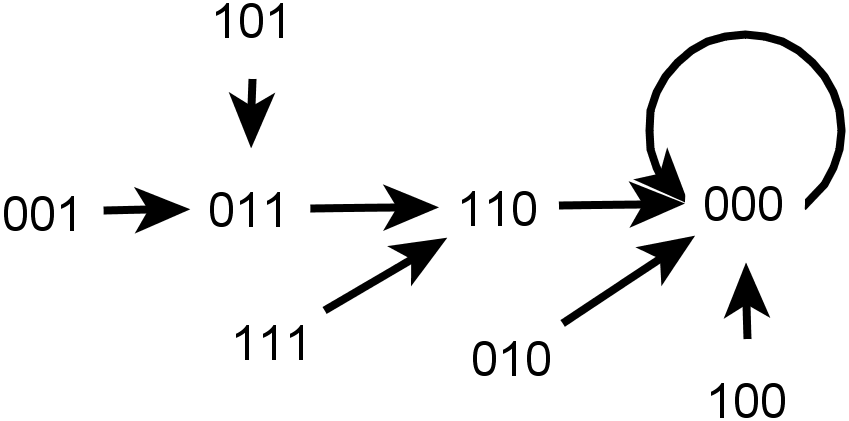
Phase space of the sequential dynamical system

Sequential dynamical systems (SDSs) are a class of discrete dynamical systems and generalize many aspects of for example classical cellular automata, and provide a framework for studying asynchronous processes over graphs. The analysis of SDSs uses techniques from combinatorics, abstract algebra, graph theory, dynamical systems and probability theory.

== Definition ==
An SDS is constructed from the following components:

- A finite graph Y with vertex set v[Y] = {1,2, ... , n}. Depending on the context the graph can be directed or undirected.
- A state x_{v} for each vertex i of Y taken from a finite set K. The system state is the n-tuple x = (x_{1}, x_{2}, ... , x_{n}), and x[i] is the tuple consisting of the states associated to the vertices in the 1-neighborhood of i in Y (in some fixed order).
- A vertex function f_{i} for each vertex i. The vertex function maps the state of vertex i at time t to the vertex state at time t + 1 based on the states associated to the 1-neighborhood of i in Y.
- A word w = (w_{1}, w_{2}, ... , w_{m}) over v[Y].

It is convenient to introduce the Y-local maps F_{i} constructed from the vertex functions by

$$F_i (x) = (x_1, x_2,\ldots, x_{i-1}, f_i(x[i]), x_{i+1}, \ldots , x_n) \;.$$

The word w specifies the sequence in which the Y-local maps are composed to derive the sequential dynamical system map F: K^{n} → K^{n} as

$$[F_Y ,w] = F_{w(m)} \circ F_{w(m-1)} \circ \cdots \circ F_{w(2)} \circ F_{w(1)} \;.$$

If the update sequence is a permutation one frequently speaks of a permutation SDS to emphasize this point. The phase space associated with a sequential dynamical system with map F: K^{n} → K^{n} is the finite directed graph with vertex set K^{n} and directed edges (x, F(x)). The structure of the phase space is governed by the properties of the graph Y, the vertex functions (f_{i})_{i}, and the update sequence w. A large part of SDS research seeks to infer phase space properties based on the structure of the system constituents.

== Example ==
Consider the case where Y is the graph with vertex set {1,2,3} and undirected edges {1,2}, {1,3} and {2,3} (a triangle or 3-circle) with vertex states from K = {0,1}. For vertex functions use the symmetric, boolean function nor : K^{3} → K defined by nor(x,y,z) = (1+x)(1+y)(1+z) with boolean arithmetic. Thus, the only case in which the function nor returns the value 1 is when all the arguments are 0. Pick w = (1,2,3) as update sequence. Starting from the initial system state (0,0,0) at time t = 0 one computes the state of vertex 1 at time t=1 as nor(0,0,0) = 1. The state of vertex 2 at time t=1 is nor(1,0,0) = 0. Note that the state of vertex 1 at time t=1 is used immediately. Next one obtains the state of vertex 3 at time t=1 as nor(1,0,0) = 0. This completes the update sequence, and one concludes that the Nor-SDS map sends the system state (0,0,0) to (1,0,0). The system state (1,0,0) is in turned mapped to (0,1,0) by an application of the SDS map.

== See also ==
- Boolean network
- Dynamic Bayesian network
- Gene regulatory network
- Graph dynamical system
- Petri net
