= Schrödinger group =

Symmetry group

The Schrödinger group is the symmetry group of the free particle Schrödinger equation. Mathematically, the group SL(2,R) acts on the Heisenberg group by outer automorphisms, and the Schrödinger group is the corresponding semidirect product.

== Schrödinger algebra ==
The Schrödinger algebra is the Lie algebra of the Schrödinger group. It is not semi-simple. In one space dimension, it can be obtained as a semi-direct sum of the Lie algebra sl(2,R) and the Heisenberg algebra; similar constructions apply to higher spatial dimensions.

It contains a Galilei algebra with central extension.

$$[J_a,J_b]=i \epsilon_{abc} J_c,\,\!$$
$$[J_a,P_b]=i \epsilon_{abc} P_c,\,\!$$
$$[J_a,K_b]=i \epsilon_{abc} K_c,\,\!$$
$$[P_a,P_b]=0, [K_a,K_b]=0, [K_a,P_b]=i \delta_{ab} M,\,\!$$
$$[H,J_a]=0, [H,P_a]=0, [H,K_a]=i P_a.\,\!$$

where $J_a, P_a, K_a, H$ are generators of rotations (angular momentum operator), spatial translations (momentum operator), Galilean boosts and time translation (Hamiltonian) respectively. (Notes: $i$ is the imaginary unit, $i^2=-1$. The specific form of the commutators of the generators of rotation $J_a$ is the one of three-dimensional space, then $a,b,c=1,\ldots,3$.). The central extension M has an interpretation as non-relativistic mass and corresponds to the symmetry of Schrödinger equation under phase transformation (and to the conservation of probability).

There are two more generators which we shall denote by D and C. They have the following commutation relations:

$$[H,C]=i D, [C,D]=-2i C, [H,D]=2i H,\,\!$$
$$[P_a,D]=i P_a, [K_i,D]=-iK_a,\,\!$$
$$[P_a,C]=-iK_a,[K_a,C]=0,\,\!$$
$$[J_a,C]=[J_a,D]=0.\,\!$$

The generators H, C and D form the sl(2,R) algebra.

A more systematic notation allows to cast these generators into the four (infinite) families $X_n, Y_m^{(j)}, M_n$ and $R_n^{(jk)}=-R_n^{(kj)}$, where n ∈ ℤ is an integer and m ∈ ℤ+1/2 is a half-integer and j,k=1,...,d label the spatial direction, in d spatial dimensions. The non-vanishing commutators of the Schrödinger algebra become (euclidean form)

$$[X_n, X_{n'}] = (n-n') X_{n+n'}$$
$$[X_n, Y_m^{(j)}] = \left( {n\over 2} -m\right) Y_{n+m}^{(j)}$$
$$[X_n, M_{n'}] = -n' M_{n+n'}$$
$$[X_n, R_{n'}^{(jk)}] = -n' R_{n'}^{(jk)}$$
$$[Y_m^{(j)}, Y_{m'}^{(k)}] = \delta_{j,k} (m-m') M_{m+m'}$$
$$[R_n^{(ij)},Y_m^{(k)}] = \delta_{i,k} Y_{n+m}^{(j)} - \delta_{j,k} Y_{n+m}^{(i)}$$
$$[R_n^{(ij)},R_{n'}^{(kl)}] = \delta_{i,k} R_{n+n'}^{(jl)} +\delta_{j,l} R_{n+n'}^{(ik)} -\delta_{i,l} R_{n+n'}^{(jk)} -\delta_{j,k} R_{n+n'}^{(il)}$$

The Schrödinger algebra is finite-dimensional and contains the generators $X_{-1,0,1}, Y_{-1/2,1/2}^{(j)}, M_0, R_0^{(jk)}$. In particular, the three generators $X_{-1}=H, X_0=D, X_{1}=C$ span the sl(2,R) sub-algebra. Space-translations are generated by $Y_{-1/2}^{(j)}$ and the Galilei-transformations by $Y_{1/2}^{(j)}$.

In the chosen notation, one clearly sees that an infinite-dimensional extension exists, which is called the Schrödinger–Virasoro algebra. Then, the generators $X_n$ with n integer span a loop-Virasoro algebra. An explicit representation as time-space transformations is given by, with n ∈ ℤ and m ∈ ℤ+1/2

$$X_n = - t^{n+1}\partial_t -{n+1\over 2}t^n\vec{r}\cdot\partial_{\vec{r}} -{n(n+1)\over 4}{\cal M}t^{n-1} \vec{r}\cdot\vec{r} -{x\over 2}(n+1) t^n$$
$$Y_m^{(j)} = -t^{m+1/2} \partial_{r_j} - \left(m+{1\over 2}\right) {\cal M} t^{m-1/2} r_j$$
$$M_n = - t^n {\cal M}$$
$$R_n^{(jk)} = -t^n \left( r_j \partial_{r_k} - r_k \partial_{r_j}\right)$$

This shows how the central extension $M_0$ of the non-semi-simple and finite-dimensional Schrödinger algebra becomes a component of an infinite family in the Schrödinger–Virasoro algebra. In addition, and in analogy with either the Virasoro algebra or the Kac–Moody algebra, further central extensions are possible. However, a non-vanishing result only exists for the commutator $[X_n, X_{n'}]$, where it must be of the familiar Virasoro form, namely

$$[X_n, X_{n'}]= (n-n') X_{n+n'} + {c\over 12}(n^3-n)\delta_{n+n',0}$$

or for the commutator between the rotations $R_n^{(jk)}$, where it must have a Kac-Moody form. Any other possible central extension can be absorbed into the Lie algebra generators.

== The role of the Schrödinger group in mathematical physics ==
Though the Schrödinger group is defined as symmetry group of the free particle Schrödinger equation, it is realized in some interacting non-relativistic systems (for example cold atoms at criticality).

The Schrödinger group in d spatial dimensions can be embedded into relativistic conformal group in d + 1 dimensions SO(2, d + 2). This embedding is connected with the fact that one can get the Schrödinger equation from the massless Klein–Gordon equation through Kaluza–Klein compactification along null-like dimensions and Bargmann lift of Newton–Cartan theory. This embedding can also be viewed as the extension of the Schrödinger algebra to the maximal parabolic sub-algebra of SO(2, d + 2).

The Schrödinger group symmetry can give rise to exotic properties to interacting bosonic and fermionic systems, such as the superfluids in bosons , and Fermi liquids and non-Fermi liquids in fermions. They have applications in condensed matter and cold atoms.

The Schrödinger group also arises as dynamical symmetry in condensed-matter applications: it is the dynamical symmetry of the Edwards–Wilkinson model of kinetic interface growth. It also describes the kinetics of phase-ordering, after a temperature quench from the disordered to the ordered phase, in magnetic systems.

== See also ==
- Schrödinger equation
- Galilean transformation
- Poincaré group
