= Schrödinger functional =

Approach to quantum field theory

In mathematical physics, some approaches to quantum field theory are more popular than others. For historical reasons, the Schrödinger representation is less favored than Fock space methods. In the early days of quantum field theory, maintaining symmetries such as Lorentz invariance, displaying them manifestly, and proving renormalisation were of paramount importance. The Schrödinger representation is not manifestly Lorentz invariant and its renormalisability was only shown as recently as the 1980s by Kurt Symanzik (1981).

The Schrödinger functional is, in its most basic form, the time translation generator of state wavefunctionals. In layman's terms, it defines how a system of quantum particles evolves through time and what the subsequent systems look like.

== Background ==
Quantum mechanics is defined over the spatial coordinates $\mathbf{x}$ upon which the Galilean group acts, and the corresponding operators act on its state as $\hat{\mathbf x}\psi(\mathbf{x})= \mathbf{x}\psi(\mathbf{x})$. The state is characterized by a wave function $\psi(\mathbf{x})=\langle\mathbf{x}|\psi\rangle$ obtained by projecting it onto the coordinate eigenstates defined by $\hat{\mathbf x}\left|\mathbf{x}\right\rangle = \mathbf{x}\left|\mathbf{x}\right\rangle$. These eigenstates are not stationary. Time evolution is generated by the Hamiltonian, yielding the Schrödinger equation $i\partial_0\left|\psi(t)\right\rangle = \hat{H}\left|\psi(t)\right\rangle$.

However, in quantum field theory, the coordinate is the field operator $\hat{\phi}_\mathbf{x}=\hat{\phi}(\mathbf{x})$, which acts on the state's wave functional as

$$\hat{\phi}(\mathbf{x}) \Psi\left[\phi(\cdot)\right] = \operatorname\phi\left(\mathbf{x}\right) \Psi\left[\phi(\cdot)\right] ,$$

where "⋅" indicates an unbound spatial argument. This wave functional

$$\Psi\left[\phi(\cdot)\right] = \left\langle\phi(\cdot)|\Psi\right\rangle$$

is obtained by means of the field eigenstates

$$\hat{\phi}(\mathbf{x}) \left|\Phi(\cdot)\right\rangle = \Phi(\mathbf{x}) \left|\Phi(\cdot)\right\rangle ,$$

which are indexed by unapplied "classical field" configurations $\Phi(\cdot)$. These eigenstates, like the position eigenstates above, are not stationary. Time evolution is generated by the Hamiltonian, yielding the Schrödinger equation,

$$i\partial_0\left|\Psi(t)\right\rangle = \hat{H}\left|\Psi(t)\right\rangle .$$

Thus the state in quantum field theory is conceptually a functional superposition of field configurations.

== Example: scalar field ==
In the quantum field theory of (as example) a quantum scalar field $\hat{\phi}(x)$, in complete analogy with the one-particle quantum harmonic oscillator, the eigenstate of this quantum field with the "classical field" $\phi(x)$ (c-number) as its eigenvalue,

$$\hat{\phi}(x)\left|\phi\right\rangle =\phi\left(x\right)\left|\phi\right\rangle$$

is (Schwartz, 2013)

$$\left|\phi\right\rangle \propto e^{-\int dx\frac{1}{2}~(\phi(x)-\hat{\Phi}_{+}(x))^{2}}\left|0\right\rangle$$

where $\hat{\Phi}_{+}\left(x\right)$ is the part of $\hat{\phi}\left( x\right)$ that only includes creation operators $a^\dagger_k$. For the oscillator, this corresponds to the representation change/map to the |x⟩ state from Fock states.

For a time-independent Hamiltonian H, the Schrödinger functional is defined as

$$\mathcal{S}[\phi_2,t_2;\phi_1,t_1]=\langle\,\phi_2\,|e^{-iH(t_2-t_1)/\hbar}|\,\phi_1\,\rangle.$$

In the Schrödinger representation, this functional generates time translations of state wave functionals, through

$$\Psi[\phi_2,t_2] = \int\!\mathcal{D}\phi_1\,\,\mathcal{S}[\phi_2,t_2;\phi_1,t_1]\Psi[\phi_1,t_1] .$$

=== States ===
The normalized, vacuum state, free field wave-functional is the Gaussian

$$\Psi_0[\phi] = \det{}^{\frac{1}{4}} \left(\frac{K}{\pi}\right)\; e^{-\frac{1}{2}\int d\vec{x} \int d\vec{y}\, \phi(\vec{x}) K(\vec{x},\vec{y}) \phi(\vec{y}) } = \det{}^{\frac{1}{4}}\left(\frac{K}{\pi}\right)\; e^{-\frac{1}{2}\phi\cdot K \cdot\phi},$$

where the covariance K is

$$K(\vec{x},\vec{y}) = \int \frac{d^3 k}{(2\pi)^3} \omega_{\vec k}\,e^{i \vec{k}\cdot(\vec{x}-\vec{y})}.$$

This is analogous to (the Fourier transform of) the product of each k-mode's ground state in the continuum limit, roughly (Hatfield 1992)

$$\Psi_0[\tilde\phi] = \lim_{\Delta k\to 0}\;\prod_{\vec k} \left(\frac{\omega_{\vec k}}{\pi}\right)^{\frac 1 4} e^{-\frac{1}{2}\omega_{\vec k}\tilde\phi(\vec k)^2 \frac{\Delta k^3}{(2\pi)^3}} \to \left(\prod_{\vec k} \left(\frac{\omega_{\vec k}}{\pi}\right)^{\frac 1 4}\right) e^{-\frac{1}{2}\int\frac{d^3k}{(2\pi)^3} \omega_{\vec k}\tilde\phi(|\vec k|)^2}.$$

Each k-mode enters as an independent quantum harmonic oscillator. One-particle states are obtained by exciting a single mode, and have the form,

$$\Psi[\phi] \propto \int d\vec{x} \int d\vec{y}\, \phi(\vec{x}) K(\vec{x},\vec{y}) f(\vec{y}) \Psi_0[\phi] = \phi\cdot K\cdot f\, e^{-\frac{1}{2}\phi\cdot K\cdot\phi} .$$

For example, putting an excitation in $\vec{k}_1$ yields (Hatfield 1992)

$$\Psi_1[\tilde\phi] = \left(\frac{2 \omega_{k_1}}{(2\pi)^3}\right)^{\frac 1 2} \tilde\phi(\vec{k}_1) \Psi_0[\tilde\phi]$$
$$\Psi_1[\phi] = \left(\frac{2 \omega_{k_1}}{(2\pi)^3}\right)^{\frac 1 2} \int d^3 y\,e^{-i \vec{k}_1 \cdot \vec y}\phi(\vec y)\Psi_0[\phi] .$$

(The factor of $(2\pi)^{-3/2}$ stems from Hatfield's setting $\Delta k = 1$.)

== Example: fermion field ==
For clarity, we consider a massless Weyl–Majorana field $\hat\psi(x)$ in 2D space in SO^{+}(1, 1), but this solution generalizes to any massive Dirac spinor in SO^{+}(1, 3). The configuration space consists of functionals $\Psi[u]$ of anti-commuting Grassmann-valued fields u(x). The effect of $\hat\psi(x)$ is

$$\hat\psi(x)|\Psi\rangle = \frac{1}{\sqrt 2}\left(u(x) + \frac{\delta}{\delta u(x)}\right) |\Psi\rangle .$$
