= Combinatorics and physics =

Combinatorial physics or physical combinatorics is the area of interaction between physics and combinatorics.

== Overview ==
"Combinatorial Physics is an emerging area which unites combinatorial and discrete mathematical techniques applied to theoretical physics, especially Quantum Theory."
"Physical combinatorics might be defined naively as combinatorics guided by ideas or insights from physics"

Combinatorics has always played an important role in quantum field theory and statistical physics. However, combinatorial physics only emerged as a specific field after a seminal work by Alain Connes and Dirk Kreimer, showing that the renormalization of Feynman diagrams can be described by a Hopf algebra.

Combinatorial physics can be characterized by the use of algebraic concepts to interpret and solve physical problems involving combinatorics. It gives rise to a particularly harmonious collaboration between mathematicians and physicists.

Among the significant physical results of combinatorial physics, we may mention the reinterpretation of renormalization as a Riemann–Hilbert problem, the fact that the Slavnov–Taylor identities of gauge theories generate a Hopf ideal, the quantization of fields and strings, and a completely algebraic description of the combinatorics of quantum field theory. An important example of applying combinatorics to physics is the enumeration of alternating sign matrix in the solution of ice-type models. The corresponding ice-type model is the six vertex model with domain wall boundary conditions.

== See also ==
- Mathematical physics
- Statistical physics
- Ising model
- Percolation theory
- Tutte polynomial
- Partition function
- Hopf algebra
- Combinatorics and dynamical systems
- Quantum mechanics
