= L-attributed grammar =

L-attributed grammars are a special type of attribute grammars. They allow the attributes to be evaluated in one depth-first left-to-right traversal of the abstract syntax tree. As a result, attribute evaluation in L-attributed grammars can be incorporated conveniently in top-down parsing.

A syntax-directed definition is L-attributed if each inherited attribute of $X_j$ on the right side of $A \rightarrow X_1, X_2, \dots, X_n$ depends only on

1. the attributes of the symbols $X_1, X_2, \dots, X_{j-1}$
2. the inherited attributes of $A$ (but not its synthesized attributes)

Every S-attributed syntax-directed definition is also L-attributed.

Implementing L-attributed definitions in Bottom-Up parsers requires rewriting L-attributed definitions into translation schemes.

Many programming languages are L-attributed. Special types of compilers, the narrow compilers, are based on some form of L-attributed grammar. These are a strict superset of S-attributed grammars used for code synthesis.

Either "inherited attributes" or "synthesized attributes" associated with the occurrence of symbol $X_1,X_2, \dots, X_n$.
