= Schrödinger method =

In combinatorial mathematics and probability theory, the Schrödinger method, named after the Austrian physicist Erwin Schrödinger, is used to solve some problems of distribution and occupancy.

Suppose

$$X_1,\dots,X_n \,$$

are independent random variables that are uniformly distributed on the interval [0, 1]. Let

$$X_{(1)},\dots,X_{(n)} \,$$

be the corresponding order statistics, i.e., the result of sorting these n random variables into increasing order. We seek the probability of some event A defined in terms of these order statistics. For example, we might seek the probability that in a certain seven-day period there were at most two days in on which only one phone call was received, given that the number of phone calls during that time was 20. This assumes uniform distribution of arrival times.

The Schrödinger method begins by assigning a Poisson distribution with expected value λt to the number of observations in the interval [0, t], the number of observations in non-overlapping subintervals being independent (see Poisson process). The number N of observations is Poisson-distributed with expected value λ. Then we rely on the fact that the conditional probability

$$P(A\mid N=n) \,$$

does not depend on λ (in the language of statisticians, N is a sufficient statistic for this parametrized family of probability distributions for the order statistics). We proceed as follows:

$$P_\lambda(A)=\sum_{n=0}^\infty P(A\mid N=n)P(N=n)=\sum_{n=0}^\infty P(A\mid N=n){\lambda^n e^{-\lambda} \over n!},$$

so that

$$e^{\lambda}\,P_\lambda(A)=\sum_{n=0}^\infty P(A\mid N=n){\lambda^n \over n!}.$$

Now the lack of dependence of P(A | N = n) upon λ entails that the last sum displayed above is a power series in λ and P(A | N = n) is the value of its nth derivative at λ = 0, i.e.,

$$P(A\mid N=n) = \left[{d^n \over d\lambda^n}\left(e^\lambda\, P_\lambda(A)\right)\right]_{\lambda=0}.$$

For this method to be of any use in finding P(A | N =n), must be possible to find P_{λ}(A) more directly than P(A | N = n). What makes that possible is the independence of the numbers of arrivals in non-overlapping subintervals.
