= British Museum algorithm =

The British Museum algorithm is a general approach to finding a solution by checking all possibilities one by one, beginning with the smallest. The term refers to a conceptual, not a practical, technique where the number of possibilities is enormous.

== See also ==
- Bogosort
- Branch and bound
- Breadth-first search
- Brute-force search

== Sources ==
This article incorporates public domain material from Paul E. Black. "British Museum technique". Dictionary of Algorithms and Data Structures. NIST..
