= Normal =

Normal(s) or The Normal(s) may refer to:

== People ==
- Charles Normal (born 1965), American record producer
- Henry Normal (born 1956), English comedian

== Places and institutions ==
- Normal, Alabama
- Normal, Illinois
- Normal, Indiana
- Normal, Kentucky
- Normal Station, Memphis
- Normal metro station, in Mexico City
- Uptown Station, otherwise known as Normal Station, in Illinois
- Normal school, a school created to train high school graduates to be teachers
- Normal (store), Danish variety store chain

== Arts and entertainment ==
=== Films ===
- Normal (2003 film), starring Jessica Lange and Tom Wilkinson
- Normal (2007 film), starring Carrie-Anne Moss, Kevin Zegers, Callum Keith Rennie, and Andrew Airlie
- Normal (2009 film), an adaptation of Anthony Neilson's 1991 play Normal: The Düsseldorf Ripper
- Normal!, a 2011 Algerian film
- The Normals (film), a 2012 American comedy film
- Normal (2025 film), starring Bob Odenkirk, with Lena Headey and Henry Winkler

=== Music ===
- Normal (Ron "Bumblefoot" Thal album), 2005
- Normal (Martin Mull album), 1974
- "Normal" (Alonzo song)
- "Normal" (Eminem song)
- "Normal", a music video by Gucci Mane
- "Normal", a song by AJR from The Click (Deluxe Edition)
- "Normal" (BTS song), a 2026 single
- "Normal", a song by Hunter Hayes from Red Sky
- "Normal", a song by Porcupine Tree from Nil Recurring
- "Normal", a song by Sasha Alex Sloan from Sad Girl
- "Nomal", a song by Ximena Sariñana from Mediocre
- The Normal, a recording project of English music producer Daniel Miller
- The Normals (Christian band), an American Christian alternative rock band
- The Normals (New Orleans band), a 1970s American punk band

=== Other media ===
- "Normal" (New Girl), an episode of the TV series
- Normal: The Düsseldorf Ripper, a 1991 play by Anthony Neilson
- The Normals, a novel by David Gilbert

== Mathematics ==
- Normal sequence (disambiguation), either a normal function or a representation of a normal number

=== Geometry and topology ===
- Normal (geometry), an object such as a line or vector that is perpendicular to a given object
- Normal bundle
- Normal cone, of a subscheme in algebraic geometry
- Normal coordinates, in differential in geometrical, local coordinates obtained from the exponential map (Riemannian geometry)
- Normal family, a pre-compact family of continuous functions
- Normal invariants, in geometric topology
- Normal polytopes, in polyhedral geometry and computational commutative algebra
- Normal space (or $T_4$), spaces, topological spaces characterized by separation of closed sets

=== Abstract algebra ===
- Normal basis (of a Galois extension), used heavily in cryptography
- Normal extensions (or quasi-Galois), field extensions, splitting fields for a set of polynomials over the base field
- Normal ring, a reduced ring whose localizations at prime ideals are integrally closed domains
- Normal scheme, a scheme whose local rings are normal domains
- Normal subgroup, a subgroup invariant under conjugation

=== Statistics ===
- Normal distribution, the Gaussian continuous probability distribution
- Normal equations, describing the solution of the linear least squares problem

=== Non-finite set theory ===
- Normal function, in set theory
- Normal measure, in set theory

=== Other uses in mathematics ===
- Normal number, a real number with a "uniform" distribution of digits
- Normal operator, an operator that commutes with its Hermitian adjoint
  - Normal matrix, a matrix that commutes with its conjugate transpose
- Normal order of an arithmetic function, a type of asymptotic behavior useful in number theory

== Physical sciences ==
- Normal concentration, a measure of concentration for a chemical in a solution
- Normal modes, of vibration in an oscillating system
- Normal order, or Wick order in quantum field theory

== Social sciences ==
- Normal goods, a concept used in economics
- Normativity, standards of what ought to be
- Social norm, a collective representation of acceptable group conduct

== See also ==
- Norm (disambiguation)
- Normal closure (disambiguation)
- Normal Field (disambiguation)
- Normal form (disambiguation)
- Normal order (disambiguation)
- Normal Township (disambiguation)
- Normality (disambiguation)
- Normalization (disambiguation)
- Normalsi, a Polish rock band
- Leaving Normal (disambiguation)
- New Normal (disambiguation)
- Usual (disambiguation)
