= Normalization =

Normalization, or normalisation, is a process that makes something more normal or regular.

== Science ==
- Normalization process theory, a sociological theory of the implementation of new technologies or innovations
- Normalization model, used in visual neuroscience
- Normalization (quantum mechanics)
- Normalized solution (mathematics)
- Normalization (sociology) or social normalization, the process through which ideas and behaviors that may fall outside of social norms come to be regarded as "normal"
- Normalization (linguistics), the process of implementing uniform orthography, punctuation, and morphology

== Mathematics and statistics ==
- Normalization of an algebraic variety, the operation consisting in taking locally the integral closure of the ring of regular functions
- Normalization (statistics), adjustments of values or distributions in statistics
  - Quantile normalization, statistical technique for making two distributions identical in statistical properties
- Normalizing (abstract rewriting), an abstract rewriting system in which every object has at least one normal form
  - Normalization property (abstract rewriting), a property of a rewrite system in mathematical logic and theoretical computer science
- Normalizing constant, in probability theory a constant to make a non-negative function a probability density function
- Noether normalization lemma, the result of commutative algebra
- Vector normalization
- Normalized number, a number in scientific notation with the decimal point in a consistent position
- Probability amplitude § Normalization

== Technology and computer science ==
- A metallurgic process used in annealing
- Normalization (image processing), changing the range of pixel intensity values
- Audio normalization, a process of uniformly increasing or decreasing the amplitude of an audio signal
- Data normalization, general reduction of data to canonical form
- Normal number, a floating point number that has exactly one bit or digit to the left of the radix point
- Database normalization, used in database theory
- Dimensional normalization, or snowflaking, removal of redundant attributes in a dimensional model
- NFD normalization (normalization form canonical decomposition), a normalization form decomposition for Unicode string searches and comparisons in text processing
- Spatial normalization, a step in image processing for neuroimaging
- Text normalization, modifying text to make it consistent
- URL normalization, process to modify URLs in a consistent manner
- Normalization (machine learning), a technique in machine learning to change activation patterns to be on a similar scale.
- Normalized frequency (digital signal processing), unit of frequency cycles/sample in digital signal processing

== Other ==
- The process of establishing normal diplomatic relations between two countries
- Normalization (people with disabilities), principle to make conditions of everyday living available to people with disabilities
- Normalization (Czechoslovakia), the restoration of the conditions prevalent before the reform in Czechoslovakia, 1969

== See also ==
- Normalized frequency (disambiguation)
- Normal form (disambiguation)
- Normal (disambiguation)
- Renormalization
