= Abnormality =

Abnormality refers to any deviation from the normal, the noun form of the adjective abnormal.

Abnormality may refer to:

== Medicine and physiology ==
- Chromosome abnormality, atypical number of chromosomes or a structural abnormality in one or more chromosomes
- Congenital abnormality, condition which is present at the time of birth which varies from the standard presentation
- Craniofacial abnormality, congenital musculoskeletal disorders which primarily affect the cranium and facial bones
- Tooth abnormality, congenital tooth disease
- Jaw abnormality, disorder in the formation or shape of the jaw
- Musculoskeletal abnormality, disorder of the musculoskeletal system present at birth
- Intraretinal microvascular abnormalities
- Gait abnormality, deviation from normal walking (gait)
- Multiple abnormalities, used to describe congenital abnormality that can not be primarily identified with a single system of the body or single disease process

== Psychology ==
- Abnormality (behavior), behavior deviating from the normal or typical
- Models of abnormality, general hypotheses as to the nature of psychological abnormalities

== See also ==
- Abnormality (band), an American death metal band from Boston, Massachusetts
- Normality (disambiguation)
