= Norm =

Norm, the Norm or NORM may refer to:

== In academic disciplines ==
- Normativity, phenomenon of designating things as good or bad
- Norm (geology), an estimate of the idealised mineral content of a rock
- Norm (philosophy), a standard in normative ethics that is prescriptive rather than a descriptive or explanatory abstraction
- Social norm, shared standards of acceptable behavior by groups
- Basic norm, a jurisprudence concept by Kelsen
- Peremptory norm, a fundamental principle of international law
- Norm (artificial intelligence), a set of statements used to regulate artificial intelligence software
- Norm, a statistical concept in psychometrics representing the aggregate responses of a standardized and representative group
- NORM, naturally occurring radioactive materials
- NORM (non-mobile older rural males), an acronym in dialect studies coined by Chambers and Trudgill (1980) for a group to which speakers frequently refer

=== In mathematics ===
- Norm (mathematics), a map that assigns a length or size to a mathematical object, including:
  - Vector norm, a map that assigns a length or size to any vector in a vector space
  - Matrix norm, a map that assigns a length or size to a matrix
  - Operator norm, a map that assigns a length or size to any operator in a function space
  - Norm (abelian group), a map that assigns a length or size to any element of an abelian group
- Field norm a map in algebraic number theory and Galois theory that generalizes the usual distance norm
- Ideal norm, the ideal-theoretic generalization of the field norm
- Baer norm, a certain subgroup of a group
- Norm map, a map from a pointset into the ordinals inducing a prewellordering
- Norm group, a group in class field theory that is the image of the multiplicative group of a field
- Norm function, a term in the study of Euclidean domains, sometimes used in place of "Euclidean function"
- Norm (descriptive set theory), a map from a set into the ordinals

== People ==
- Norm (given name)
- Norm Macdonald, a Canadian comedian

== Arts and entertainment ==
- Norm Peterson, a character in the sitcom Cheers and its spin-off Frasier
- Norm, a recurring character in Phineas and Ferb
- The Norm (comic strip), syndicated by Michael Jantze
- The Norm (radio), a former CBC radio show
- The Norm, a character in the 1989 film Spirits of the Air, Gremlins of the Clouds
- Norm, the main character in the Norm of the North films
- Norm (album), a 2023 album by Andy Shauf

== Other uses ==
- National Organization of Russian Muslims, a religious organization based in Russia
- Norm (chess), a chess result required to qualify for an official title
- NORM (NACK-Oriented Reliable Multicast), a transport protocol
- Norm, a character from the Australian government physical fitness program and advertising campaign "Life. Be in it."
- Norms Restaurants, a chain of restaurants in Southern California

== See also ==
- The Norm Show, a television series featuring Norm Macdonald
- Norman (disambiguation)
- Normal (disambiguation)
- Norma (disambiguation)
- Technical standard
