= Normal form =

Normal form may refer to:

- Normal form (databases)
- Normal form (game theory)
- Canonical form
- Normal form (dynamical systems)
- Hesse normal form
- Normal form in music
- Jordan normal form

in formal language theory:

- Chomsky normal form
- Greibach normal form
- Kuroda normal form
- Normal form (abstract rewriting), an element of a rewrite system which cannot be further rewritten

in logic:

- Normal form (natural deduction)
- Algebraic normal form
- Canonical normal form
- Clausal normal form
- Conjunctive normal form
- Disjunctive normal form
- Negation normal form
- Prenex normal form
- Skolem normal form

in lambda calculus:

- Beta normal form

== See also ==
- Normalization (disambiguation)
- Normalization property
