= Norma =

Norma may refer to:

- Norma (given name), a given name (including a list of people with the name)

== Astronomy ==
- Norma (constellation)
- 555 Norma, a minor asteroid
- Cygnus Arm or Norma Arm, a spiral arm in the Milky Way galaxy

== Geography ==
- Norma, Lazio, a city in the province of Latina, Italy
- Norma, Tibet
- Norma Triangle, a neighborhood of West Hollywood, California
- Norma, New Jersey, an unincorporated place in Salem Township, New Jersey

== Arts, entertainment, and media ==
- Norma (album), by Mon Laferte
- Norma (journal), in men's studies
- Norma (opera), by Vincenzo Bellini
- Norma (play), by Henrik Ibsen
- Grupo Editorial Norma, a Colombian publishing house
- Norma Editorial, a comics publishing company in Spain, unrelated to Grupo Editorial Norma
- Norma, a 1942 sculpture by Abram Belskie
- Norma, a novel by Vladimir Sorokin

== Other uses ==
- Norma (AK-86), a never-commissioned U.S. Navy cargo vessel
- Norma (supermarket), a supermarket in Europe
- NoRMA, No Remote Memory Access, a computer memory architecture for multiprocessor systems
- NORMA (software modeling tool), Neumont Object-Role Modeling Architect
- Norma Auto Concept, a French racing car constructor
- Norma Precision, a Swedish ammunition manufacturer
- Norma (Estonian company), produces car safety system components
- List of storms named Norma, numerous tropical cyclones worldwide have been named Norma
- FC Norma Tallinn, an Estonian football club
