= David Benveniste =

American entrepreneur

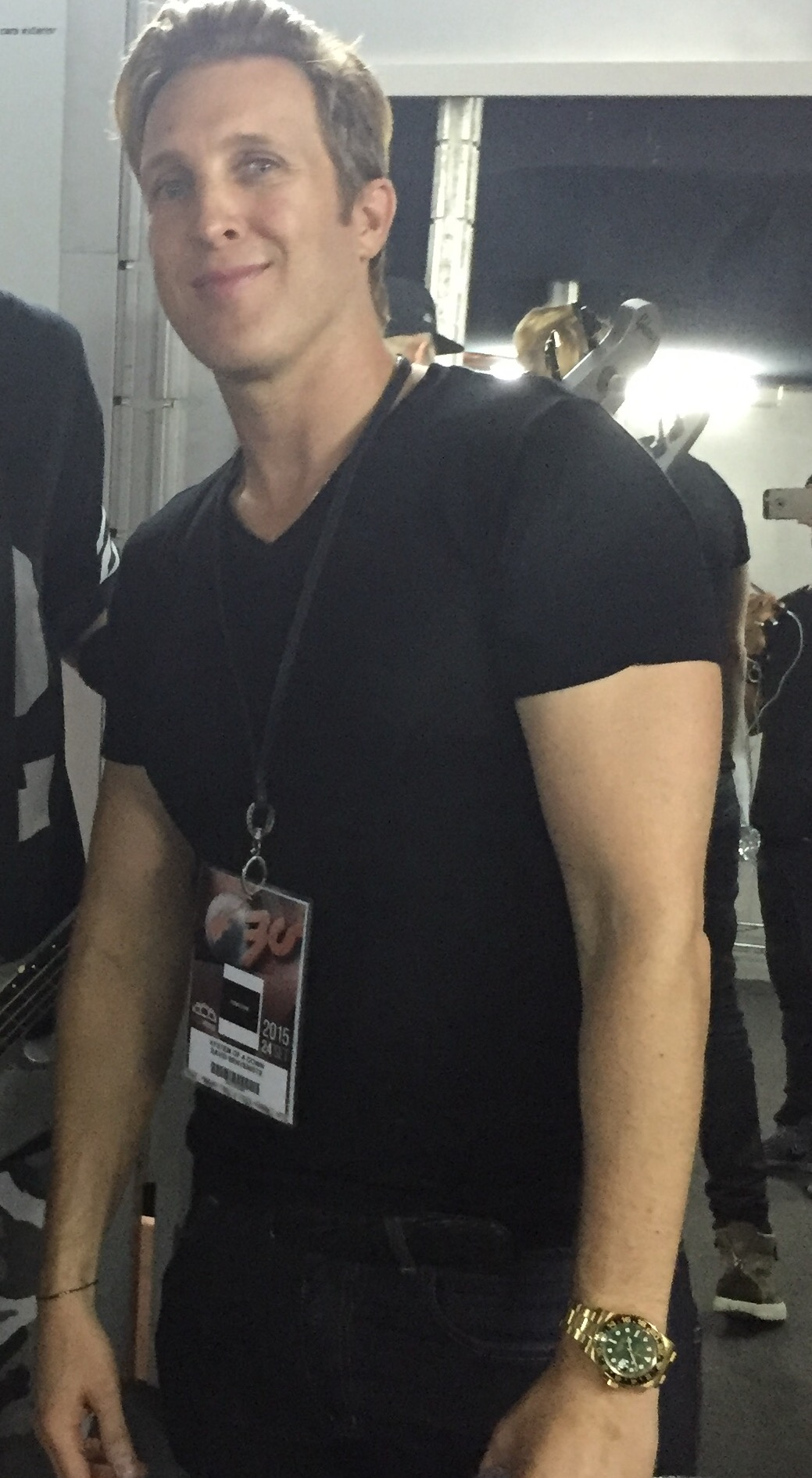
- 2014
- Born: Beverly Hills, California
- Education: USC, (BA, Communications)
- Occupations: CEO & owner of Velvet Hammer Music and Management Group
- Website: velvethammer.net

David Benveniste is an American entrepreneur from Beverly Hills, California. He is CEO and founder of Velvet Hammer Music and Management Group. Benveniste is also the co-creator of Sick New World Festival.

== Early life and education ==
Benveniste attended Beverly Hills High School and graduated from Annenberg School of Communication and Journalism at the University of Southern California.

== Career ==
In 1996, after seeing System of a Down (SOAD) perform at a rehearsal in North Hollywood, Benveniste gradually took over managerial duties for the band.

In 1997, Benveniste founded Velvet Hammer Music and Management Group. Velvet Hammer also went on to include a publishing branch and record label, to which OneRepublic was signed.

Around the same time that Velvet Hammer was founded, Benveniste also founded digital marketing agency, StreetWise Concepts & Culture.

== Personal life ==
In 2018, Benveniste purchased a home in Norma Triangle, West Hollywood from actor Jesse Metcalfe.
