= Biological model =

A biological model is an organism or system representing a more complex biological entity. It may refer to:

- a model organism, a non-human species that is extensively studied to understand particular biological phenomena present in many related organisms
- an in vitro model system, representing complex in vivo systems
- a mathematical model of a biological system, e.g.,
  - the biological neuron model, a mathematical description of the properties of certain cells in the nervous system
- a scientific model of a biological system, e.g.
  - the fluid mosaic model
- Models of abnormality#The biological (medical) model, the only model of psychological abnormalities not based on psychological principles
