= Regular order =

Terms such as regular order, regular orders, and the like can refer to:

- Regular order (United States Congress), a process of governance
- Normal order (disambiguation)
- Regular clergy, members of a religious order who live according to a prescribed rule

== See also ==
- Order (disambiguation)
- Regular (disambiguation)
