= Normal order (disambiguation) =

Normal order may refer to:

- Normal order of creation and annihilation operators in theoretical physics
- Normal order evaluation in computer science
- Normal order of an arithmetic function in number theory

== See also ==
- Normal (disambiguation)
- Regular (disambiguation)
- Regular order (disambiguation)
