= Growing context-sensitive grammar =

In formal language theory, a growing context-sensitive grammar is a context-sensitive grammar in which the productions increase the length of the sentences being generated. These grammars are thus noncontracting and context-sensitive. A growing context-sensitive language is a context-sensitive language generated by these grammars.

In these grammars the "start symbol" S does not appear on the right hand side of any production rule and the length of the right hand side of each production exceeds the length of the left side, unless the left side is S.

These grammars were introduced by Dahlhaus and Warmuth. They were later shown to be equivalent to the acyclic context-sensitive grammars. Membership in any growing context-sensitive language is polynomial time computable; however, the uniform problem of deciding whether a given string belongs to the language generated by a given growing or acyclic context-sensitive grammar is NP-complete.

== See also ==
- Noncontracting grammar
