= Usual =

Usual may refer to:

- Common
- Normal
- "The Usual", a 2020 song by Sam Fischer
