= Normal closure =

The term normal closure is used in two senses in mathematics:

- In group theory, the normal closure of a subset of a group is the smallest normal subgroup that contains the subset.
- In field theory, the normal closure of an algebraic extension F/K is an extension field L of F such that L/K is normal and L is minimal with this property.
