= Normal polytope =

Type of polytope in mathematics

In mathematics, specifically in combinatorial commutative algebra, a convex lattice polytope P is called normal if it has the following property: given any positive integer n, every lattice point of the dilation nP, obtained from P by scaling its vertices by the factor n and taking the convex hull of the resulting points, can be written as the sum of exactly n lattice points in P. This property plays an important role in the theory of toric varieties, where it corresponds to projective normality of the toric variety determined by P. Normal polytopes have popularity in algebraic combinatorics. These polytopes also represent the homogeneous case of the Hilbert bases of finite positive rational cones and the connection to algebraic geometry is that they define projectively normal embeddings of toric varieties.

== Definition ==
Let $P\subset\mathbb{R}^d$ be a lattice polytope. Let $L\subseteq \mathbb{Z}^d$ denote the lattice (possibly in an affine subspace of $\mathbb{R}^d$) generated by the integer points in $P$. Letting $v$ be an arbitrary lattice point in $P$, this can be defined as

$$L=v+\sum_{x,y \in P \cap \mathbb{Z}^d} \mathbb{Z}(x-y).$$

P is integrally closed if the following condition is satisfied:

$c\in\mathbb{N}, z\in cP\cap\mathbb{Z}^d\implies \exists x_1,\ldots,x_c\in P\cap\mathbb{Z}^d$ such that $x_1+\cdots+x_c=z$.

P is normal if the following condition is satisfied:

$c\in \mathbb{N}, z\in cP\cap L\implies \exists x_1,\ldots,x_c\in P\cap L$ such that $x_1+\cdots+x_c=z$.

The normality property is invariant under affine-lattice isomorphisms of lattice polytopes and the integrally closed property is invariant under an affine change of coordinates. Note sometimes in combinatorial literature the difference between normal and integrally closed is blurred.

== Examples ==
The simplex in R^{k} with the vertices at the origin and along the unit coordinate vectors is normal. unimodular simplices are the smallest polytope in the world of normal polytopes. After unimodular simplices, lattice parallelepipeds are the simplest normal polytopes.

For any lattice polytope P and $c \isin \mathbb{N}$, c ≥ dimP-1 cP is normal.

All polygons or two-dimensional polytopes are normal.

If A is a totally unimodular matrix, then the convex hull of the column vectors in A is a normal polytope.

The Birkhoff polytope is normal. This can easily be proved using Hall's marriage theorem. In fact, the Birkhoff polytope is compressed, which is a much stronger statement.

All order polytopes are known to be compressed. This implies that these polytopes are normal.

== Properties ==
- A lattice polytope is integrally closed if and only if it is normal and L is a direct summand of $\mathbb{Z}$^{d}.
- A normal polytope can be made into a full-dimensional integrally closed polytope by changing the lattice of reference from $\mathbb{Z}$^{d} to L and the ambient Euclidean space $\mathbb{R}$^{d} to the subspace $\mathbb{R}$L.
- If a lattice polytope can be subdivided into normal polytopes then it is normal as well.
- If a lattice polytope in dimension d has lattice lengths greater than or equal to 4d(d + 1) then the polytope is normal.
- If P is normal and φ:$\mathbb{R}$^{d} → $\mathbb{R}$^{d} is an affine map with φ($\mathbb{Z}$^{d}) = $\mathbb{Z}$^{d} then φ(P) is normal.
- Every k-dimensional face of a normal polytope is normal.

Proposition

P ⊂ $\mathbb{R}$^{d} a lattice polytope. Let C(P)=$\mathbb{R}$_{+}(P,1) ⊂ $\mathbb{R}$^{d+1} the following are equivalent:

1. P is normal.
2. The Hilbert basis of C(P) ∩ $\mathbb{Z}$^{d+1} = (P,1) ∩ $\mathbb{Z}$^{d+1}

Conversely, for a full dimensional rational pointed cone C⊂$\mathbb{R}$^{d} if the Hilbert basis of C∩$\mathbb{Z}$^{d} is in a hyperplane H ⊂ $\mathbb{R}$^{d} (dim H = d − 1). Then C ∩ H is a normal polytope of dimension d − 1.

== Relation to normal monoids ==
Any cancellative commutative monoid M can be embedded into an abelian group. More precisely, the canonical map from M into its Grothendieck group K(M) is an embedding. Define the normalization of M to be the set

$$\{ x \in K(M) \mid nx \in M,\ n\in\mathbb{N} \},$$

where nx here means x added to itself n times. If M is equal to its normalization, then we say that M is a normal monoid. For example, the monoid N^{n} consisting of n-tuples of natural numbers is a normal monoid, with the Grothendieck group Z^{n}.

For a polytope P ⊆ R^{k}, lift P into R^{k+1} so that it lies in the hyperplane x_{k+1} = 1, and let C(P) be the set of all linear combinations with nonnegative coefficients of points in (P,1). Then C(P) is a convex cone,

$$C(P)=\{ \lambda_1(\textbf{x}_1, 1) + \cdots + \lambda_n(\textbf{x}_n, 1) \mid \textbf{x}_i \in P,\ \lambda_i \in \mathbb{R}, \lambda_i\geq 0\}.$$

If P is a convex lattice polytope, then it follows from Gordan's lemma that the intersection of C(P) with the lattice Z^{k+1} is a finitely generated (commutative, cancellative) monoid. One can prove that P is a normal polytope if and only if this monoid is normal.

== Open problem ==
Oda's question: Are all smooth polytopes integrally closed?

A lattice polytope is smooth if the primitive edge vectors at every vertex of the polytope define a part of a basis of $\mathbb{Z}$^{d}. So far, every smooth polytope that has been found has a regular unimodular triangulation. It is known that up to trivial equivalences, there are only a finite number of smooth $d$-dimensional polytopes with $n$ lattice points, for each natural number $n$ and $d$.

== See also ==
- Convex cone
- Algebraic geometry
- Number theory
- Ring theory
- Ehrhart polynomial
- Rational cone
- Toric variety
