= Normal sequence =

In mathematics, the term normal sequence has multiple meanings, depending on the area of specialty. In general, it is a sequence with "nice" properties.

- In set theory, a normal sequence is one that is continuous and strictly increasing.
- In probability theory, a normal number is a number whose representation is a normal sequence in all bases, i.e. regardless of which base is chosen (e.g. base 2, base 8, base 10, etc.) the sequence of digits contains every finite subsequence with equal probability.
