= Norm (abelian group) =

In mathematics, specifically abstract algebra, if $(G, +)$ is an (abelian) group with identity element $e$ then $\nu\colon G \to \mathbb{R}$ is said to be a norm on $(G, +)$ if:

1. Positive definiteness: $\nu(g) > 0 \text{ for all } g \ne e \text{ and } \nu(e) = 0$,
2. Subadditivity: $\nu(g+h) \le \nu(g) + \nu(h)$,
3. Inversion (Symmetry): $\nu(-g) = \nu(g) \text{ for all } g \in G$.

An alternative, stronger definition of a norm on $(G, +)$ requires

1. $\nu(g) > 0 \text{ for all } g \ne e$,
2. $\nu(g+h) \le \nu(g) + \nu(h)$,
3. $\nu(mg) = |m| \, \nu(g) \text{ for all } m \in \mathbb{Z}$.

The norm $\nu$ is discrete if there is some real number $\rho > 0$ such that $\nu(g) > \rho$ whenever $g \ne 0$.

== Free abelian groups ==
An abelian group is a free abelian group if and only if it has a discrete norm.
