= New Normal =

New Normal or The New Normal may refer to:

- New normal, a prevailing situation following a crisis

== Music ==
- The New Normal (album), a 2005 album by Cog
- The New Normal!, a 2024 album by Will Wood
- New Normal, a 2019 album by Horrorshow
- "New Normal", a song by Caroline Polachek from the 2019 album Pang
- New Normal Music, an American Internet radio station

== Television ==
- The New Normal (TV series), an American series
- New Normal: The Survival Guide, a Philippine program
- "New Normal" (Homeland), a 2015 episode
- "The New Normal" (Amphibia), a 2021 episode
- "The New Normal" (The Bold Type), a 2019 episode
- "A New Normal", a 2008 episode of Greek

== Other uses ==
- New Normal (manga), a Japanese manga series
