= Norma (Estonian company) =

Company based in Estonia

Norma is an Autoliv subsidiary and produces car safety system components; Norma belongs to Autoliv group. These safety system components are made for e.g. Audi, Bentley, Porsche, Volkswagen and Tesla cars.

The predecessor of the company was Michelson's workshop (Estonian: Michelsoni plekitöökoda), which was established in 1891. The name "Norma" is used since 1931.

Nowadays Norma was established in 1994.

In 2002, the net turnover was 1 billion Estonian krones. In 2002, most production (98%) was exported.
