= Greibach normal form =

Form for context-free grammars

In formal language theory, a context-free grammar is in Greibach normal form (GNF) if the right-hand sides of all production rules start with a terminal symbol, optionally followed by some non-terminals. A non-strict form allows one exception to this format restriction for allowing the empty word (epsilon, ε) to be a member of the described language. The normal form was established by Sheila Greibach and it bears her name.

More precisely, a context-free grammar is in Greibach normal form, if all production rules are of the form:

$$A \to a A_1 A_2 \cdots A_n$$

where $A$ is a nonterminal symbol, $a$ is a terminal symbol, and $A_1 A_2 \ldots A_n$ is a (possibly empty) sequence of nonterminal symbols.

Observe that the grammar does not have left recursions.

Every context-free grammar can be transformed into an equivalent grammar in Greibach normal form. Various constructions exist. Some do not permit the second form of rule and cannot transform context-free grammars that can generate the empty word. For one such construction the size of the constructed grammar is O(n^{4}) in the general case and O(n^{3}) if no derivation of the original grammar consists of a single nonterminal symbol, where n is the size of the original grammar. This conversion can be used to prove that every context-free language can be accepted by a real-time (non-deterministic) pushdown automaton, i.e., the automaton reads a letter from its input every step.

Given a grammar in GNF and a derivable string in the grammar with length n, any top-down parser will halt at depth n.

== Variants of Greibach normal form ==
It is even possible to convert a grammar into Greibach normal form in a way such that in every production, at most two nonterminal symbols occur on the right-hand side; this is referred to as quadratic Greibach normal form.

A context-free grammar is in double Greibach normal form, if all production rules take one of the two forms:

$$A \to a A_1 A_2 \cdots A_nb$$
$$A \to a$$

where $A$ is a nonterminal symbol, $a,b$ are terminal symbols (not necessarily distinct), and $A_1 A_2 \ldots A_n$ is a (possibly empty) sequence of nonterminal symbols. Similarly as above, a grammar is in quadratic double Greibach normal form, if at most two nonterminal symbols occur in the right-hand side of each production. A classic result by Hotz (1978) states that every context-free grammar that does not generate the empty word can be effectively converted into an equivalent grammar in quadratic double Greibach normal form.

== See also ==
- Backus–Naur form
- Chomsky normal form
- Kuroda normal form
