= Normalization (machine learning) =

Machine learning technique

In machine learning, normalization is a statistical technique with various applications. There are two main forms of normalization, namely data normalization and activation normalization. Data normalization (or feature scaling) includes methods that rescale input data so that the features have the same range, mean, variance, or other statistical properties. For instance, a popular choice of feature scaling method is min-max normalization, where each feature is transformed to have the same range (typically $[0,1]$ or $[-1,1]$). This solves the problem of different features having vastly different scales, for example if one feature is measured in kilometers and another in nanometers.

Activation normalization, on the other hand, is specific to deep learning, and includes methods that rescale the activation of hidden neurons inside neural networks.

Normalization is often used to:

- increase the speed of training convergence,
- reduce sensitivity to variations and feature scales in input data,
- reduce overfitting,
- and produce better model generalization to unseen data.

Normalization techniques are often theoretically justified as reducing covariance shift, smoothing optimization landscapes, and increasing regularization, though they are mainly justified by empirical success.

== Batch normalization ==
Batch normalization (BatchNorm) operates on the activations of a layer for each mini-batch.

Consider a simple feedforward network, defined by chaining together modules:

$$x^{(0)} \mapsto x^{(1)} \mapsto x^{(2)} \mapsto \cdots$$

where each network module can be a affine transform, a nonlinear activation function, a convolution, etc. $x^{(0)}$ is the input vector, $x^{(1)}$ is the output vector from the first module, etc.

BatchNorm is a module that can be inserted at any point in the feedforward network. For example, suppose it is inserted just after $x^{(l)}$, then the network would operate accordingly:

$$\cdots \mapsto x^{(l)} \mapsto \mathrm{BN}(x^{(l)}) \mapsto x^{(l+1)} \mapsto \cdots$$
The BatchNorm module does not operate over individual inputs. Instead, it must operate over one batch of inputs at a time.

Concretely, suppose we have a batch of inputs $x^{(0)}_{(1)}, x^{(0)}_{(2)}, \dots, x^{(0)}_{(B)}$, fed all at once into the network. We would obtain in the middle of the network some vectors:
$$x^{(\text{layer})}_{\text{vector coordinate}} : x^{(l)}_{(1)}, x^{(l)}_{(2)}, \dots, x^{(l)}_{(B)}$$
The BatchNorm module computes the coordinate-wise mean and variance of these vectors:
$$\begin{aligned}
\mu^{(l)}_i &= \frac 1B \sum_{b=1}^B x^{(l)}_{(b), i} \\
(\sigma^{(l)}_i)^2 &= \frac{1}{B} \sum_{b=1}^B (x_{(b),i}^{(l)} - \mu_i^{(l)})^2
\end{aligned}$$
where $i$ indexes the coordinates of the vectors, and $b$ indexes the elements of the batch. In other words, we are considering the $i$-th coordinate of each vector in the batch, and computing the mean and variance of these numbers.

More transparently, we may write
$$\begin{aligned}
\mu^{(\text{layer }\ell)}_{\text{vector coordinate }i}  &= \operatorname{Avg}( b , x^{(l)}_{(\text{batch } b), i}) \\
(\sigma^{(l)}_i)^2 &= \operatorname{Avg}(b, (x_{(b),i}^{(l)} - \mu_i^{(l)})^2)
\end{aligned}$$
It then normalizes each coordinate to have zero mean and unit variance:
$$\hat{x}^{(l)}_{(b), i} = \frac{x^{(l)}_{(b), i} - \mu^{(l)}_i}{\sqrt{(\sigma^{(l)}_i)^2 + \epsilon}}$$
The $\epsilon$ is a small positive constant such as $10^{-9}$ added to the variance for numerical stability, to avoid division by zero.

The entire operation is a data whitening transformation of the $x^{(\text{layer } \ell)}_{(\text{batch } b), \text{vector coordinate }i}$ tensor over the $b$-index, with the small positive constant $\epsilon$ added for numerical stability. We notate it as:
$$\hat{x}^{(\text{layer } \ell)}_{(\text{batch } b), \text{vector coordinate }i}= \operatorname{Whiten}_\epsilon(x^{(l)}_{(b), i} | b)$$
Finally, it applies a affine transformation:
$$y^{(l)}_{(b), i} = \gamma^{(\ell)}_i \hat{x}^{(\ell)}_{(b), i} + \beta^{(\ell)}_i$$
Here, $\gamma$ and $\beta$ are parameters inside the BatchNorm module. They are learnable parameters, typically trained by gradient descent, while $\epsilon$ is a hyperparameter (i.e. not trained) of the BatchNorm module.

More succinctly,
$$y^{(\text{layer } \ell)}_{(\text{batch } b), \text{vector coordinate }i} =
\gamma^{(\ell)}_i
\operatorname{Whiten}_\epsilon(x^{(l)}_{(b), i} | b) + \beta^{(\ell)}_i$$
More succinctly,

	normalize	affine
BatchNorm	batch $b$	layer $\ell$, vector coordinate $i$

=== Interpretation ===
$\gamma$ and $\beta$ allow the network to learn to undo the normalization, if this is beneficial. BatchNorm can be interpreted as removing the purely affine transformations, so that its layers focus solely on modelling the nonlinear aspects of data, which may be beneficial, as a neural network can always be augmented with a affine transformation layer on top.

It is claimed in the original publication that BatchNorm works by reducing internal covariance shift, though the claim has both supporters and detractors.

=== Special cases ===
The original paper recommended to only use BatchNorms after a affine transform, not after a nonlinear activation. That is, $\phi(\mathrm{BN}(Wx + b))$, not $\mathrm{BN}(\phi(Wx + b))$. Also, the bias $b$ does not matter, since it would be canceled by the subsequent mean subtraction, so it is of the form $\mathrm{BN}(Wx)$. That is, if a BatchNorm is preceded by a affine transform, then that affine transform's bias term is set to zero.

==== CNN ====
For convolutional neural networks (CNNs), BatchNorm must preserve the translation-invariance of these models, meaning that it must treat all outputs of the same kernel as if they are different data points within a batch. This is sometimes called Spatial BatchNorm, or BatchNorm2D, or per-channel BatchNorm.

Concretely, suppose we have a 2-dimensional convolutional layer defined by:
$$x^{(l)}_{h, w, c} = \sum_{h', w', c'} K^{(l)}_{h'-h, w'-w, c, c'} x_{h', w', c'}^{(l-1)} + b^{(l)}_c$$
where:

- $x^{(l)}_{h, w, c}$ is the activation of the neuron at position $(h, w)$ in the $c$-th channel of the $l$-th layer.
- $K^{(l)}_{\Delta h, \Delta w, c, c'}$ is a kernel tensor. Each channel $c$ corresponds to a kernel $K^{(l)}_{h'-h, w'-w, c, c'}$, with indices $\Delta h, \Delta w, c'$.
- $b^{(l)}_c$ is the bias term for the $c$-th channel of the $l$-th layer.

In order to preserve the translational invariance, BatchNorm treats all outputs from the same kernel in the same batch as more data in a batch. That is, it is applied once per kernel $c$ (equivalently, once per channel $c$), not per activation $x^{(l+1)}_{h, w, c}$:
$$\begin{aligned}
\mu^{(l)}_c &= \frac{1}{BHW} \sum_{b=1}^B \sum_{h=1}^H \sum_{w=1}^W x^{(l)}_{(b), h, w, c} \\
(\sigma^{(l)}_c)^2 &= \frac{1}{BHW} \sum_{b=1}^B \sum_{h=1}^H \sum_{w=1}^W (x_{(b), h, w, c}^{(l)} - \mu_c^{(l)})^2
\end{aligned}$$
where $B$ is the batch size, $H$ is the height of the feature map, and $W$ is the width of the feature map. That is, even though there are only $B$ data points in a batch, all $BHW$ outputs from the kernel in this batch are treated equally.

Subsequently, normalization and the affine transform is also done per kernel:
$$\begin{aligned}
\hat{x}^{(l)}_{(b), h, w, c} &= \frac{x^{(l)}_{(b), h, w, c} - \mu^{(l)}_c}{\sqrt{(\sigma^{(l)}_c)^2 + \epsilon}} \\
y^{(l)}_{(b), h, w, c} &= \gamma^{(\ell)}_c \hat{x}^{(l)}_{(b), h, w, c} + \beta^{(\ell)}_c
\end{aligned}$$
This generalizes to n-dimensional CNN.

	normalize	affine
BatchNorm for 2D CNN	batch $b$, height $h$, width $w$	layer $\ell$, channel $c$
BatchNorm for nD CNN	batch $b$, indices $i_1, \dots, i_n$	layer $\ell$, channel $c$

The original BatchNorm is a special case of BatchNorm for 0-dimensional CNN.

==== RNN ====
A multilayered recurrent neural networks (RNN) is similar to a 1-dimensional RNN. Consequently, BatchNorm for 1D CNN applies.

	normalize	affine
BatchNorm for RNN as 1D CNN	batch $b$, time $t$	layer $\ell$, vector coordinate $i$

However there are certain complications. In certain RNN applications, such as machine translation or next-character prediction, the full sequence is not available at the same time. This is unlike the case of 1D CNN, where the entire sequence is always available. Consequently, there are two variants of BatchNorm for RNNs: frame-wise and sequence-wise. The sequence-wise BatchNorm is the same as that of 1D CNN. The frame-wise BatchNorm does not normalize over time $t$.

	normalize	affine
BatchNorm for RNN, sequence-wise (same as 1D CNN)	batch $b$, time $t$	layer $\ell$, vector coordinate $i$
BatchNorm for RNN, frame-wise	batch $b$	layer $\ell$, vector coordinate $i$

Sequence-wise BatchNorm is suited for tasks such as speech recognition, where entire sequences are available, but with variable lengths. Because in a batch where sequences have variable lengths, the smaller sequences are padded with zeroes to match the size of the longest sequence of the batch. In such setups, the number of unpadded frames decreases along the time axis, so the statistics estimates for frame-wise BatchNorm would deteriorate as $t$ increases.

Also, BatchNorm is usually applied only for the input-to-hidden part, not the hidden-to-hidden part. Let the hidden state of the $l$-th layer at time $t$ be $h_t^{(l)}$. The standard RNN, without normalization, satisfies
$$h^{(l)}_t = \phi(W^{(l)} h_t^{(l-1)} + U^{(l)} h_{t-1}^{(l)} + b^{(l)})$$
where $W^{(l)}, U^{(l)}, b^{(l)}$ are weights and biases, and $\phi$ is the activation function. Applying BatchNorm, this becomes
$$h^{(l)}_t = \phi(\mathrm{BN}(W^{(l)} h_t^{(l-1)}) + U^{(l)} h_{t-1}^{(l)})$$
It is also possible to apply BatchNorm to LSTMs.

=== Improvements ===
In ghost BatchNorm, a batch is randomly partitioned into sub-batches, and BatchNorm is performed separately on each.

A particular problem with BatchNorm is that during training, the mean and variance are calculated on the fly for each batch, but during inference, the mean and variance were frozen from those calculated during training. Concretely, consider a vector $x^{(\ell)}_{(b)}$. During training, BatchNorm produces . This train-test disparity degrades performance. The disparity can be decreased by simulating the moving average during inference:

$$\begin{aligned}
\mu &= \alpha E[x] + (1 - \alpha) \mu_{x, \text{ train}} \\
\sigma^2 &= (\alpha E[x]^2 + (1 - \alpha) \mu_{x^2, \text{ train}}) - \mu^2
\end{aligned}$$

where $\alpha$ is a hyperparameter to be optimized on a validation set.

Other works attempt to eliminate BatchNorm, such as the Normalizer-Free ResNet.

== Layer normalization ==
Layer normalization (LayerNorm) is a popular alternative to BatchNorm. Unlike BatchNorm, which normalizes activations across the batch dimension for a given feature, LayerNorm normalizes across all the features within a single data sample. Compared to BatchNorm, LayerNorm's performance is not affected by batch size. It is a key component of transformer models.

For a given data input and layer, LayerNorm computes the mean $\mu$ and variance $\sigma^2$ over all the neurons in the layer. Similar to BatchNorm, learnable parameters $\gamma$ (scale) and $\beta$ (shift) are applied. It is defined by:
$$\hat{x_i} = \frac{x_i - \mu}{\sqrt{\sigma^2 + \epsilon}}, \quad y_i = \gamma_i \hat{x_i} + \beta_i$$
where:
$$\mu = \frac 1D \sum_{i=1}^D x_i, \quad \sigma^2 = \frac 1D \sum_{i=1}^D (x_i - \mu)^2$$
and the index $i$ ranges over the neurons in that layer. More succinctly, More succinctly,

	normalize	affine
LayerNorm	vector coordinate $i$	layer $\ell$

=== Examples ===
For example, in CNN, a LayerNorm applies to all activations in a layer. In the previous notation, we have:

$$\begin{aligned}
\mu^{(l)} &= \frac{1}{HWC} \sum_{h=1}^H \sum_{w=1}^W\sum_{c=1}^C x^{(l)}_{h, w, c} \\
(\sigma^{(l)})^2 &= \frac{1}{HWC}  \sum_{h=1}^H \sum_{w=1}^W\sum_{c=1}^C (x_{h, w, c}^{(l)} - \mu^{(l)})^2 \\
\hat{x}^{(l)}_{h,w,c} &= \frac{\hat{x}^{(l)}_{h,w,c} - \mu^{(l)}}{\sqrt{(\sigma^{(l)})^2 + \epsilon}} \\
y^{(l)}_{h,w,c} &= \gamma^{(l)} \hat{x}^{(l)}_{h,w,c}  + \beta^{(l)}
\end{aligned}$$

Notice that the batch index $b$ is removed, while the channel index $c$ is added.

In recurrent neural networks and transformers, LayerNorm is applied individually to each timestep. For example, if the hidden vector in an RNN at timestep $t$ is $x^{(t)} \in \mathbb{R}^{D}$, where $D$ is the dimension of the hidden vector, then LayerNorm will be applied with:

$$\hat{x_{i}}^{(t)} = \frac{x_i^{(t)} - \mu^{(t)}}{\sqrt{(\sigma^{(t)})^2 + \epsilon}}, \quad y_i^{(t)} = \gamma_i \hat{x_i}^{(t)}  + \beta_i$$
where:
$$\mu^{(t)} = \frac 1D \sum_{i=1}^D x_i^{(t)}, \quad (\sigma^{(t)})^2 = \frac 1D \sum_{i=1}^D (x_i^{(t)} - \mu^{(t)})^2$$
More succinctly,

	normalize	affine
LayerNorm for RNN and Transformers	vector coordinate $i$	layer $\ell$

=== Root mean square layer normalization ===
Root mean square layer normalization (RMSNorm):

$$\hat{x_i} = \frac{x_i}{\sqrt{\frac 1D \sum_{j=1}^D x_j^2}}, \quad y_i = \gamma \hat{x_i}  + \beta$$

Essentially, it is LayerNorm where we enforce $\mu, \epsilon = 0$. It is also called L2 normalization. It is a special case of Lp normalization, or power normalization:
$$\hat{x_i} = \frac{x_i}{\left(\frac 1D \sum_{j=1}^D |x_j|^p \right)^{1/p}}, \quad y_i = \gamma \hat{x_i}  + \beta$$
where $p > 0$ is a constant.

=== Adaptive ===
Adaptive layer norm (AdaLN) computes the $\gamma, \beta$ in a LayerNorm not from the layer activation itself, but from other data. It was first proposed for CNNs, and has been used effectively in diffusion transformers (DiTs). For example, in a DiT, the conditioning information (such as a text encoding vector) is processed by a multilayer perceptron into $\gamma, \beta$, which is then applied in the LayerNorm module of a transformer.

== Weight normalization ==
Weight normalization (WeightNorm) is a technique inspired by BatchNorm that normalizes weight matrices in a neural network, rather than its activations.

One example is spectral normalization, which divides weight matrices by their spectral norm. The spectral normalization is used in generative adversarial networks (GANs) such as the Wasserstein GAN. The spectral radius can be efficiently computed by the following algorithm:

INPUT matrix $W$ and initial guess $x$

Iterate $x \mapsto \frac{1}{\|Wx\|_2}Wx$ to convergence $x^*$. This is the eigenvector of $W$ with eigenvalue $\|W\|_s$.

RETURN $x^*, \|Wx^*\|_2$

By reassigning $W_i \leftarrow \frac{W_i}{\|W_i\|_s}$ after each update of the discriminator, we can upper-bound $\|W_i\|_s \leq 1$, and thus upper-bound $\|D \|_L$.

The algorithm can be further accelerated by memoization: at step $t$, store $x^*_i(t)$. Then, at step $t+1$, use $x^*_i(t)$ as the initial guess for the algorithm. Since $W_i(t+1)$ is very close to $W_i(t)$, so is $x^*_i(t)$ to $x^*_i(t+1)$, thus allowing rapid convergence.

== CNN-specific normalization ==
There are some activation normalization techniques that are only used for CNNs.

=== Group normalization ===
Group normalization (GroupNorm) can be understood as the LayerNorm for CNN, applied once per channel group, rather than per image. Conversely, LayerNorm is GroupNorm where all channels are placed in one group.

Suppose at a layer $l$, there are channels $1, 2, \dots, C$, then it is partitioned into groups $g_1, g_2, \dots, g_G$. Then, LayerNorm is applied to each group.

=== Instance normalization ===
Instance normalization (InstanceNorm), or contrast normalization, is a technique first developed for neural style transfer, and is also only used for CNNs. It can be understood as the LayerNorm for CNN applied once per channel, or equivalently, as group normalization where each group consists of a single channel:
$$\begin{aligned}
\mu^{(l)}_c &= \frac{1}{HW} \sum_{h=1}^H \sum_{w=1}^Wx^{(l)}_{h, w, c} \\
(\sigma^{(l)}_c)^2 &= \frac{1}{HW}  \sum_{h=1}^H \sum_{w=1}^W (x_{h, w, c}^{(l)} - \mu^{(l)}_c)^2 \\
\hat{x}^{(l)}_{h,w,c} &= \frac{\hat{x}^{(l)}_{h,w,c} - \mu^{(l)}_c}{\sqrt{(\sigma^{(l)}_c)^2 + \epsilon}} \\
y^{(l)}_{h,w,c} &= \gamma^{(l)}_c \hat{x}^{(l)}_{h,w,c}  + \beta^{(l)}_c
\end{aligned}$$

	normalize	affine
InstanceNorm	height $h$, width $w$	layer $\ell$, channel $c$

=== Response normalization ===
Local response normalization was used in AlexNet. It was applied in a convolutional layer, just after a nonlinear activation function. It was defined by:

$$b_{x, y}^i=\frac{a_{x, y}^i}{\left(k+\alpha \sum_{j=\max (0, i-n / 2)}^{\min (N-1, i+n / 2)}\left(a_{x, y}^j\right)^2\right)^\beta}$$

where $a_{x,y}^i$ is the activation of the neuron at location $(x,y)$ and channel $i$. I.e., each pixel in a channel is suppressed by the activations of the same pixel in its adjacent channels.

$k, n, \alpha, \beta$ are hyperparameters picked by using a validation set.

It was a variant of the earlier local contrast normalization.

$$b_{x, y}^i=\frac{a_{x, y}^i}{\left(k+\alpha \sum_{j=\max (0, i-n / 2)}^{\min (N-1, i+n / 2)}\left(a_{x, y}^j - \bar a_{x, y}^j\right)^2\right)^\beta}$$

where $\bar a_{x, y}^j$ is the average activation in a small window centered on location $(x,y)$ and channel $i$. The hyperparameters $k, n, \alpha, \beta$, and the size of the small window, are picked by using a validation set.

Similar methods were called divisive normalization, as they divide activations by a number depending on the activations. They were originally inspired by biology, where it was used to explain nonlinear responses of cortical neurons and nonlinear masking in visual perception.

Both kinds of local normalization were obviated by batch normalization, which is a more global form of normalization.

Response normalization reappeared in ConvNeXT-2 as global response normalization.

=== Adaptive instance normalization ===
Adaptive instance normalization (AdaIN) is a variant of instance normalization, designed specifically for neural style transfer with CNNs, rather than just CNNs in general.

In the AdaIN method of style transfer, we take a CNN and two input images, one for content and one for style. Each image is processed through the same CNN, and at a certain layer $l$, AdaIn is applied.

Let $x^{(l), \text{ content}}$ be the activation in the content image, and $x^{(l), \text{ style}}$ be the activation in the style image. Then, AdaIn first computes the mean and variance of the activations of the content image $x'^{(l)}$, then uses those as the $\gamma, \beta$ for InstanceNorm on $x^{(l), \text{ content}}$. Note that $x^{(l), \text{ style}}$ itself remains unchanged. Explicitly, we have:

$$\begin{aligned}
y^{(l), \text{ content}}_{h,w,c} &= \sigma^{(l),
\text{ style}}_c \left( \frac{x^{(l), \text{ content}}_{h,w,c} - \mu^{(l), \text{ content}}_c}{\sqrt{(\sigma^{(l), \text{ content}}_c)^2 + \epsilon}} \right) + \mu^{(l), \text{ style}}_c
\end{aligned}$$

== Transformers ==
Some normalization methods were designed for use in transformers.

The original 2017 transformer used the "post-LN" configuration for its LayerNorms. It was difficult to train, and required careful hyperparameter tuning and a "warm-up" in learning rate, where it starts small and gradually increases. The pre-LN convention, proposed several times in 2018, was found to be easier to train, requiring no warm-up, leading to faster convergence.

FixNorm and ScaleNorm both normalize activation vectors in a transformer. The FixNorm method divides the output vectors from a transformer by their L2 norms, then multiplies by a learned parameter $g$. The ScaleNorm replaces all LayerNorms inside a transformer by division with L2 norm, then multiplying by a learned parameter $g'$ (shared by all ScaleNorm modules of a transformer).

Query-Key normalization (QKNorm) normalizes query and key vectors to have unit L2 norm. This is used in scaled cosine attention, where the query-key-value attention mechanism is changed from $\sum_{i} \operatorname{softmax}(qk_1^T/\sqrt d, \dots, qk_\ell^T/\sqrt d)_i v_i$ to
$$\sum_{i} \operatorname{softmax}(s\underbrace{qk_1^T/ \|q\|\|k_1\|}_{\cos\angle(q, k_1)}, \dots, s\underbrace{qk_\ell^T/ \|q\|\|k_\ell\|}_{\cos\angle(q, k_\ell)})_i v_i$$
where $s$ is a scalar.

In nGPT, many vectors are normalized to have unit L2 norm: hidden state vectors, input and output embedding vectors, weight matrix columns, and query and key vectors.

== Miscellaneous ==
Gradient normalization (GradNorm) normalizes gradient vectors during backpropagation.

== Summary tables ==
In all tables below, $b$ is batch, $\ell$ is layer.

MLP, $i$ is vector coordinate
	normalize	affine
BatchNorm	$b$	$\ell, i$
LayerNorm	$i$	$\ell, i$
LN without affine	$i$	

2D CNN, $h, w$ are height and width, $c$ is channel
	normalize	affine on
BatchNorm	$b, h, w$	$\ell, c$
LayerNorm	$c, h, w$	$\ell, c$
LayerNorm (ConvNeXt)	$c$	$\ell, c$
InstanceNorm	$h, w$	$\ell, c$
GroupNorm	$c$ in group, $h, w$	$\ell, c$

RNN, $t$ is time, $i$ is vector coordinate
	normalize	affine on
BatchNorm, frame-wise	$b$	$\ell, i$
BatchNorm, sequence-wise	$b, t$	$\ell, i$
LayerNorm	$i$	$\ell, i$

== See also ==
- Data preprocessing
- Feature scaling
