= Multiple abnormalities =

- Specialty: Medical genetics

When a patient has multiple abnormalities (multiple anomaly, multiple deformity), they have a congenital abnormality that cannot be primarily identified with a single system of the body or single disease process. Most medical conditions can have systemic sequelae, but multiple abnormalities occur when the effects on multiple systems is immediately obvious.

== Causes ==
Abnormalities can have a range of multifactorial causes including; genetic causes, maternal conditions during pregnancy, combination of environment and genetic causes or unknown etiologies.
