= Normality =

Normality may refer to:

== Mathematics, probability, and statistics ==
- Asymptotic normality, in mathematics and statistics
- Complete normality or normal space,
- Log-normality, in probability theory
- Normality (category theory)
- Normality (statistics) or normal distribution, in probability theory
- Normality tests, used to determine if a data set is well-modeled by a normal distribution

== Science ==
- Normality (behavior), the property of conforming to a norm
- Normality (chemistry), the equivalent concentration of a solution
- Principle of normality, in solid mechanics

== Other uses ==
- Normality (video game), a 1996 adventure video game by Gremlin Interactive
- Normality bias, a belief people hold when considering the possibility of a disaster

== See also ==
- Normal (disambiguation)
- Return to normalcy, a campaign slogan
