= Normalization (linguistics) =

Process of implementing uniform text

In linguistics, normalization is the process of implementing uniform orthography, punctuation, and morphology, especially when publishing modern editions of older texts. Such often occur with transcriptions of text written in older writing systems, for example Nordic runic inscriptions, which are usually normalized into the regional specific Runic Norse, as well as Classical Old Norse (Old Icelandic).

== Example ==
Normalization of the Karlevi Runestone given by the Swedish National Heritage Board (RAÄ):

Original segment:

ᛘᚢᚾᛅᛏ ᛬ ᚱᛅᛁᚦ᛬ᚢᛁᚦᚢᚱ ᛬ ᚱᛅᚦᛅ ᛬ ᚱᚢᚴ᛬ᛋᛏᛆᚱᚴᚱ ᛫ ᛁ ᛫ ᛏᛅᚾᛘᛅᚱᚴᚢ ᛬ --ᚾᛏᛁᛚᛋ ᛬ ᛁᛅᚱᛘᚢᚾ᛫᛫ᚴᚱᚢᚾᛏᛅᚱ ᛬ ᚢᚱᚴᚱᚭᚾᛏᛅᚱᛁ ᛬ ᛚᚬᚾᛏᛁ
munat : raiþ:uiþur : raþa : ruk:starkr · i · tanmarku : --ntils : iarmun··kruntar : urkrontari : lonti

Normalization into Runic Danish:

munat Ræið-Viðurr raða rogstarkʀ i Danmarku [Æ]ndils iarmungrundaʀ uʀgrandaʀi landi.

Normalization into Classical Old Norse:

munat Reið-Viðurr ráða rógstarkr í Danmǫrku [E]ndils jǫrmungrundar ørgrandari landi.

Translation:

"Never again shall such a battle-hardened sea-warrior (Viðurr-of-the-Carriage of [the Sea-king] Endill's mighty dominion ( = God of the vessels of the sea) ), rule unsurpassed over land in Denmark."
