= Zero stroke =

Alleged mental disorder

Zero stroke or cipher stroke was an alleged mental disorder, reportedly diagnosed by physicians in Germany during the hyperinflation in the Weimar Republic (1921–24). The disorder was primarily characterized by the desire of patients to write endless rows of zeros, which are also referred to as ciphers.

== Background ==
Weimar Republic hyperinflation from one to one trillion paper marks per gold mark. Note the logarithmic scale.

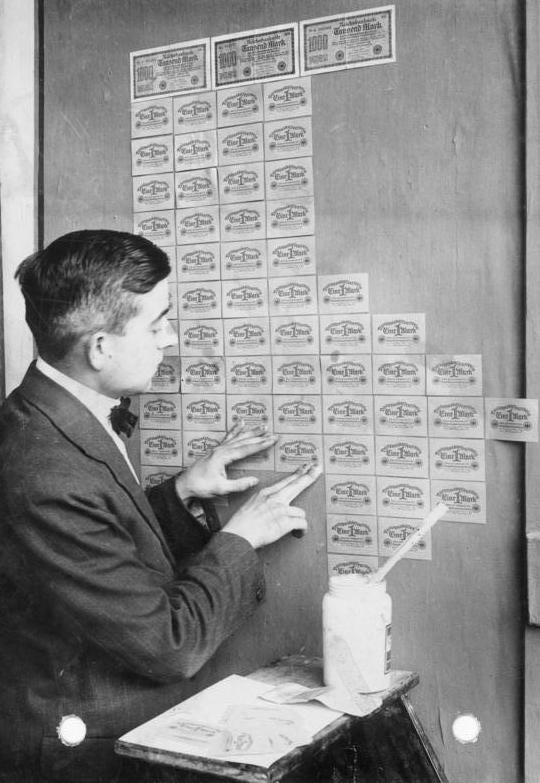
Germany, 1923: banknotes had lost so much value that they were used as wallpaper.

After the Treaty of Versailles, which formally ended World War I in 1919, Germany faced a damaged economy and a requirement to pay immense war reparations to the Allies. At the beginning of 1921, the German currency was relatively stable at about 60 paper marks per US dollar, but inflation rapidly increased after August 1921, and the mark fell to less than one third of a cent by November 1921 (approx. 330 marks per US dollar). The mark stabilized again at the beginning of 1922, but when there was no resolution to the reparations problem the inflation changed to hyperinflation and the mark fell to 8000 marks per dollar by December 1922. The inflation reached its peak by November 1923 when a new currency (the Rentenmark) was introduced.

== Cause ==
The zero stroke disorder was supposedly caused by the dizzying speed of hyperinflation and the calculations required to conduct commerce under its effect. It has been said that during the worst period of hyperinflation that in the time it took to drink a cup of coffee, the price for the cup could double. The fast pace of hyperinflation caused people to quickly buy goods when they received their wages. Workers would demand to be paid at the beginning of the day for their work and after they were paid, they would be given half an hour to run off to buy goods before their earnings became worthless. The requirements to calculate and recalculate commercial transactions in the billions and trillions made it practically impossible to do business in paper marks.

== Description ==
Zero stroke has been described in slightly different terms by various authors.

One Time article that reported on the condition described it as follows:

With the price of bread running into billions a loaf the German people have had to get used to counting in thousands of billions. This, according to some German physicians, brought on a new nervous disease known as "zero stroke," or "cipher stroke," which may, however, be classed with neuritis as cipheritis. The persons afflicted with the malady are perfectly normal, except "for a desire to write endless rows of ciphers and engage in computations more involved than the most difficult problems in logarithms."

Another newspaper article at the time described the condition as:

Zero stroke is the name of the latest German ailment. It is the nervous affliction of bookkeepers who grow dizzy from the number of ciphers that must be set in a row after the integers before German marks are sufficiently numerous to come within hailing distance of real money.

Cashiers, bookkeepers, and bankers were reportedly the most prone to this affliction. Besides a compulsion to write endless strings of zeros, individuals that suffered from this condition would reportedly become confused when referring to numbers and would state that they were ten billion years old or had forty trillion children.

Later John Kenneth Galbraith would describe the condition in his 1975 book Money: Whence It Came, Where It Went:

'Zero stroke' or 'cipher stroke' is the name created by German physicians for a prevalent nervous malady brought about by the present fantastic currency figures. Scores of cases of the 'stroke' are reported among men and women of all classes, who have been prostrated by their efforts to figure in thousands of millions. Many of these persons are apparently normal, except for their desire to write endless rows of ciphers.
