= Leaving Normal =

Leaving Normal may refer to:

- Leaving Normal (film), 1992 American film
- "Leaving Normal" (Roswell), episode of the TV series Roswell
