= Baer norm =

Concept in group theory

In mathematics, in the field of group theory, the norm of a group is the intersection of the normalizers of all its subgroups. This is also termed the Baer norm, after Reinhold Baer.

The following facts are true for the Baer norm:

- It is a characteristic subgroup.
- It contains the center of the group.
- It is contained inside the second term of the upper central series.
- It is a Dedekind group, so is either abelian or has a direct factor isomorphic to the quaternion group.
- If it contains an element of infinite order, then it is equal to the center of the group.
