= Normal Field =

Normal Field or normal field may refer to:

- Normal Field (Arizona), a former field of the Arizona State Sun Devils
- Normal Park, a former field of the Chicago Cardinals
- Normal extension, in algebra
