= Normal Township =

Normal Township may refer to:

- Normal Township, McLean County, Illinois
- Normal Township, McHenry County, North Dakota, in McHenry County, North Dakota

== See also ==
- Norman Township (disambiguation)
