= Chomsky normal form =

Notation for context-free formal grammars

In formal language theory, a context-free grammar, G, is said to be in Chomsky normal form (first described by Noam Chomsky) if all of its production rules are of the form:

A → BC, or
A → a, or
S → ε,

where A, B, and C are nonterminal symbols, the letter a is a terminal symbol (a symbol that represents a constant value), S is the start symbol, and ε denotes the empty string. Also, neither B nor C may be the start symbol, and the third production rule can only appear if ε is in L(G), the language produced by the context-free grammar G.

Every grammar in Chomsky normal form is context-free, and conversely, every context-free grammar can be transformed into an equivalent one (Note: that is, one that produces the same language) which is in Chomsky normal form and has a size no larger than the square of the original grammar's size.

== Converting a grammar to Chomsky normal form ==
To convert a grammar to Chomsky normal form, a sequence of simple transformations is applied in a certain order; this is described in most textbooks on automata theory. The presentation here follows Hopcroft, Ullman (1979), but is adapted to use the transformation names from Lange, Leiß (2009). (Note: For example, Hopcroft, Ullman (1979) merged TERM and BIN into a single transformation.) Each of the following transformations establishes one of the properties required for Chomsky normal form.

=== START: Eliminate the start symbol from right-hand sides ===
Introduce a new start symbol S_{0}, and a new rule

S_{0} → S,

where S is the previous start symbol. This does not change the grammar's produced language, and S_{0} will not occur on any rule's right-hand side.

=== TERM: Eliminate rules with nonsolitary terminals ===
To eliminate each rule

A → X_{1} ... a ... X_{n}

with a terminal symbol a being not the only symbol on the right-hand side, introduce, for every such terminal, a new nonterminal symbol N_{a}, and a new rule

N_{a} → a.

Change every rule

A → X_{1} ... a ... X_{n}

to

A → X_{1} ... N_{a} ... X_{n}.

If several terminal symbols occur on the right-hand side, simultaneously replace each of them by its associated nonterminal symbol. This does not change the grammar's produced language.

=== BIN: Eliminate right-hand sides with more than 2 nonterminals ===
Replace each rule

A → X_{1} X_{2} ... X_{n}

with more than 2 nonterminals X_{1},...,X_{n} by rules

A → X_{1} A_{1},
A_{1} → X_{2} A_{2},
... ,
A_{n-2} → X_{n-1} X_{n},

where A_{i} are new nonterminal symbols. Again, this does not change the grammar's produced language.

=== DEL: Eliminate ε-rules ===
An ε-rule is a rule of the form

A → ε,

where A is not S_{0}, the grammar's start symbol.

To eliminate all rules of this form, first determine the set of all nonterminals that derive ε. Hopcroft and Ullman (1979) call such nonterminals nullable, and compute them as follows:

- If a rule A → ε exists, then A is nullable.
- If a rule A → X_{1} ... X_{n} exists, and every single X_{i} is nullable, then A is nullable, too.

Obtain an intermediate grammar by replacing each rule

A → X_{1} ... X_{n}

by all versions with some nullable X_{i} omitted. By deleting in this grammar each ε-rule, unless its left-hand side is the start symbol, the transformed grammar is obtained.

For example, in the following grammar, with start symbol S_{0},

S_{0} → AbB | C
B → AA | AC
C → b | c
A → a | ε

the nonterminal A, and hence also B, is nullable, while neither C nor S_{0} is. Hence the following intermediate grammar is obtained: (Note: indicating a kept and omitted nonterminal N by N and ~~N~~, respectively)

S_{0} → AbB | Ab~~B~~ | ~~A~~bB | ~~A~~b~~B~~ | C
B → AA | ~~A~~A | A~~A~~ | ~~A~~ε~~A~~ | AC | ~~A~~C
C → b | c
A → a | ε

In this grammar, all ε-rules have been "inlined at the call site". (Note: If the grammar had a rule S_{0} → ε, it could not be "inlined", since it had no "call sites". Therefore it could not be deleted in the next step.) In the next step, they can hence be deleted, yielding the grammar:

S_{0} → AbB | Ab | bB | b | C
B → AA | A | AC | C
C → b | c
A → a

This grammar produces the same language as the original example grammar, viz. {ab,aba,abaa,abab,abac,abb,abc,b,ba,baa,bab,bac,bb,bc,c}, but has no ε-rules.

=== UNIT: Eliminate unit rules ===
A unit rule is a rule of the form

A → B,

where A, B are nonterminal symbols. To remove it, for each rule

B → X_{1} ... X_{n},

where X_{1} ... X_{n} is a string of nonterminals and terminals, add rule

A → X_{1} ... X_{n}

unless this is a unit rule which has already been (or is being) removed. The skipping of nonterminal symbol B in the resulting grammar is possible due to B being a member of the unit closure of nonterminal symbol A.

=== Order of transformations ===
Mutual preservation of transformation results
Transformation X always preserves ( ✓) resp. may destroy ( ✗) the result of Y:
Y X	START	TERM	BIN	DEL	UNIT
START		Yes	Yes	No	No
TERM	Yes		No	Yes	Yes
BIN	Yes	Yes		Yes	Yes
DEL	Yes	Yes	Yes		No
UNIT	Yes	Yes	Yes	( ✓)^{*}	
^{*}UNIT preserves the result of DEL if START had been called before.

When choosing the order in which the above transformations are to be applied, it has to be considered that some transformations may destroy the result achieved by other ones. For example, START will re-introduce a unit rule if it is applied after UNIT. The table shows which orderings are admitted.

Moreover, the worst-case bloat in grammar size (Note: i.e. written length, measured in symbols) depends on the transformation order. Using |G| to denote the size of the original grammar G, the size blow-up in the worst case may range from |G|^{2} to 2^{2 |G|}, depending on the transformation algorithm used. The blow-up in grammar size depends on the order between DEL and BIN. It may be exponential when DEL is done first, but is linear otherwise. UNIT can incur a quadratic blow-up in the size of the grammar. The orderings START,TERM,BIN,DEL,UNIT and START,BIN,DEL,UNIT,TERM lead to the least (i.e. quadratic) blow-up.

== Example ==
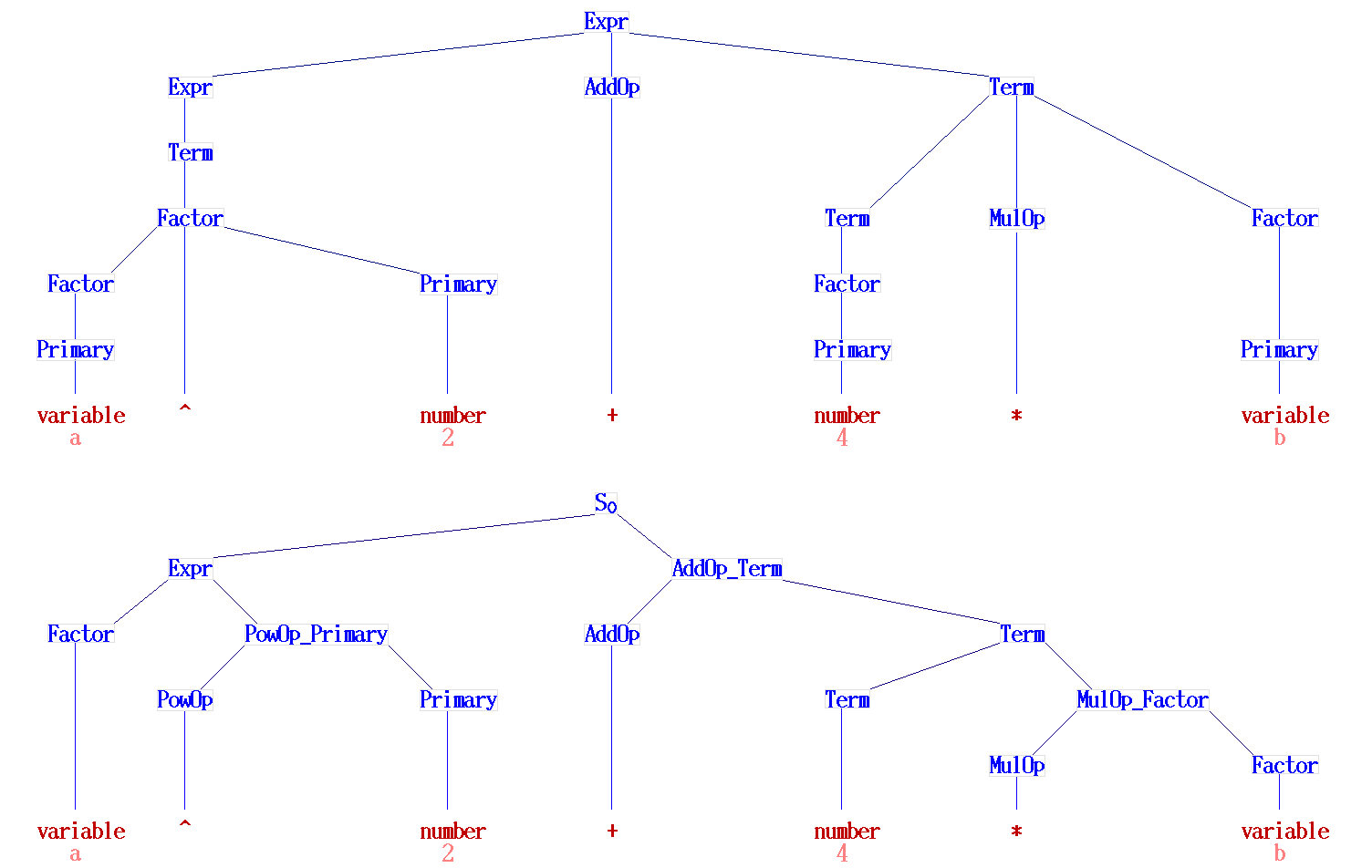
Abstract syntax tree of the arithmetic expression "a^2+4*b" wrt. the example grammar (top) and its Chomsky normal form (bottom)

The following grammar, with start symbol Expr, describes a simplified version of the set of all syntactical valid arithmetic expressions in programming languages like C or Algol60. Both number and variable are considered terminal symbols here for simplicity, since in a compiler front end their internal structure is usually not considered by the parser. The terminal symbol "^" denoted exponentiation in Algol60.

Expr	→ Term	| Expr AddOp Term	| AddOp Term
Term	→ Factor	| Term MulOp Factor
Factor	→ Primary	| Factor ^ Primary
Primary	→ number	| variable	| ( Expr )
AddOp	→ +	| −
MulOp	→ *	| /

In step "START" of the above conversion algorithm, just a rule S_{0}→Expr is added to the grammar. After step "TERM", the grammar looks like this:

S_{0}	→ Expr
Expr	→ Term	| Expr AddOp Term	| AddOp Term
Term	→ Factor	| Term MulOp Factor
Factor	→ Primary	| Factor PowOp Primary
Primary	→ number	| variable	| Open Expr Close
AddOp	→ +	| −
MulOp	→ *	| /
PowOp	→ ^
Open	→ (
Close	→ )

After step "BIN", the following grammar is obtained:

S_{0}	→ Expr
Expr	→ Term	| Expr AddOp_Term	| AddOp Term
Term	→ Factor	| Term MulOp_Factor
Factor	→ Primary	| Factor PowOp_Primary
Primary	→ number	| variable	| Open Expr_Close
AddOp	→ +	| −
MulOp	→ *	| /
PowOp	→ ^
Open	→ (
Close	→ )
AddOp_Term	→ AddOp Term
MulOp_Factor	→ MulOp Factor
PowOp_Primary	→ PowOp Primary
Expr_Close	→ Expr Close

Since there are no ε-rules, step "DEL" does not change the grammar. After step "UNIT", the following grammar is obtained, which is in Chomsky normal form:

S_{0}	→ number	| variable	| Open Expr_Close	| Factor PowOp_Primary	| Term MulOp_Factor	| Expr AddOp_Term	| AddOp Term
Expr	→ number	| variable	| Open Expr_Close	| Factor PowOp_Primary	| Term MulOp_Factor	| Expr AddOp_Term	| AddOp Term
Term	→ number	| variable	| Open Expr_Close	| Factor PowOp_Primary	| Term MulOp_Factor
Factor	→ number	| variable	| Open Expr_Close	| Factor PowOp_Primary
Primary	→ number	| variable	| Open Expr_Close
AddOp	→ +	| −
MulOp	→ *	| /
PowOp	→ ^
Open	→ (
Close	→ )
AddOp_Term	→ AddOp Term
MulOp_Factor	→ MulOp Factor
PowOp_Primary	→ PowOp Primary
Expr_Close	→ Expr Close

The N_{a} introduced in step "TERM" are PowOp, Open, and Close. The A_{i} introduced in step "BIN" are AddOp_Term, MulOp_Factor, PowOp_Primary, and Expr_Close.

== Alternative definition ==
=== Chomsky reduced form ===
Another way to define the Chomsky normal form is:

A formal grammar is in Chomsky reduced form if all of its production rules are of the form:

$A \rightarrow\, BC$ or
$$A \rightarrow\, a$$,

where $A$, $B$ and $C$ are nonterminal symbols, and $a$ is a terminal symbol. When using this definition, $B$ or $C$ may be the start symbol. Only those context-free grammars which do not generate the empty string can be transformed into Chomsky reduced form.

=== Floyd normal form ===
In a letter where he proposed a term Backus–Naur form (BNF), Donald E. Knuth implied a BNF "syntax in which all definitions have such a form may be said to be in 'Floyd Normal Form'",

$\langle A \rangle ::= \, \langle B \rangle \mid \langle C \rangle$ or
$\langle A \rangle ::= \, \langle B \rangle \langle C \rangle$ or
$$\langle A \rangle ::=\, a$$,

where $\langle A \rangle$, $\langle B \rangle$ and $\langle C \rangle$ are nonterminal symbols, and $a$ is a terminal symbol, because Robert W. Floyd found any BNF syntax can be converted to the above one in 1961. But he withdrew this term, "since doubtless many people have independently used this simple fact in their own work, and the point is only incidental to the main considerations of Floyd's note." While Floyd's note cites Chomsky's original 1959 article, Knuth's letter does not.

== Application ==
Besides its theoretical significance, CNF conversion is used in some algorithms as a preprocessing step, e.g., the CYK algorithm, a bottom-up parsing for context-free grammars, and its variant probabilistic CKY.

== See also ==
- Backus–Naur form
- CYK algorithm
- Greibach normal form
- Kuroda normal form
- Pumping lemma for context-free languages — its proof relies on the Chomsky normal form
