= Norma Triangle =

Neighborhood in West Hollywood, California, United States

Coordinates: 34.0876°N 118.3856°W

Norma Triangle is a residential neighborhood in West Hollywood, California. It encompasses the area bound by Doheny Drive and Beverly Hills on the west, Sunset Boulevard and Holloway Drive on the north, and Santa Monica Boulevard on the south. The small district has the shape of a right triangle.

The neighborhood is walkable and upscale with cafes and restaurants, shopping, nightclubs, parks, and bars in close proximity. The Norma Triangle includes a small portion of the Sunset Strip and a large portion of "Boys' Town" a popular gay district on Santa Monica Blvd. It is also home to the Ticketmaster corporate headquarters, the largest employer in West Hollywood, as well as a number of IAC/InterActiveCorp subsidiaries, including Tinder and CityGrid Media.

The Norma Triangle neighborhood is represented by The Norma Triangle Neighborhood Watch with the main goals of creating a tight knit community, ensuring residents feel safe and secure, and voicing neighborhood concerns with the City Council members of West Hollywood.

Past neighborhood events include the National Night Out block party.

== Street Names and Homes ==
Contrary to some reports, Norma Place and the neighborhood is not named after silent film star Norma Talmadge. After extensive research, historians believe Norma Place and streets like Clark, Lloyd, Cynthia, Dicks, Hammond, and others "were named after senior executives of the Los Angeles Pacific Railroad Company, owned by Moses Sherman and Eli P. Clark, who built the streets, or their spouses or children." Moses Sherman founded the town of Sherman where many rail lines merged and streetcar barns were housed. Sherman was subsequently renamed to West Hollywood.

Homes in the area were built in the early 1900s for the people who worked for the Los Angeles Pacific Railway, which had a depot at the Pacific Design Center site. After WWII, interior designers and decorators started moving into many of the single family homes when "furnishing showrooms that had historically only located downtown started to seek less expensive storefront space" along Robertson and Beverly Boulevards within West Hollywood.

== Single-family zone ==
Within the Norma Triangle Neighborhood is the Single-Family (R1B) Zone. This zone encompasses the area south of Vista Grande Street, west of Hilldale Avenue, the houses along and north of Lloyd Street, and east of Doheny Drive.

The zone "boasts an eclectic mix of one- and two-story buildings in a wide range of styles and eras. These include Hollywood Regency homes, French eclectic, Spanish revival, contemporary modern, and traditional homes."

The City of West Hollywood adopted the Norma Triangle Single-Family Design Guidelines in 2017 with the purpose of managing change, protecting distinctive characteristics of the neighborhood, and allowing flexibility in design creativity.

== Notable landmarks and buildings ==
Lloyd Wright Home and Studio located at 858 Doheny Drive. The home and studio was designed by and constructed for Lloyd Wright in 1927. Wright, eldest son of noted architect Frank Lloyd Wright, lived and worked from the location from 1927 until his death in 1978.

824 North Robertson Blvd. Originally constructed in 1921 as a lace factory, the building is one of the neighborhood's most significant historical links to the silent film era. It was utilized for rehearsals and independent production by film star Norma Talmadge, whose presence in the area is credited with giving the Norma Triangle its name. In 1956, the space was purchased by legendary designer Tony Duquette, who converted the "ruined" film studio into his primary residence and "maximalist" design salon, hosting cultural figures such as Aldous Huxley and Arthur Rubinstein. From 1970 to 2012, it housed the Margo Leavin Gallery, a landmark of the Los Angeles contemporary art scene. Since 2015, the building has served as the headquarters for Annapurna Pictures.

The San Vicente Bungalows located at 845 San Vicente Blvd. The famed hotelier Jeff Klein bought the nine-bungalow complex in 2013 and after a "six-year renovation estimated to have cost $50 million" opened it up in 2019 as a private clubhouse. Renovations included moving one of the bungalows built circa 1899 to a location across the street and converting it to Hotel 850. Prior to the renovations, the bungalows were known as the San Vicente Inn and "operated as a “clothing-optional” gay resort and developed a reputation as a place for drug abuse and prostitution."

The West Hollywood Elementary is the only public elementary school in WeHo, located at 970 North Hammond St. near Harratt.

The First Baptist Church of Beverly Hills is located in the Norma Triangle neighborhood at 9025 Cynthia Street. It was "built by members of the Dutch Reform Church in the 1920s, the First Baptist is the only remaining church from the Town of Sherman... was officially designated an Historic Site in 1993 by the City of West Hollywood."

9091 Santa Monica Blvd. Built in 1924, this building "once housed a drug store and many other businesses over the years. It is unique in that it had second floor apartments, something that was rare for buildings of that period." The building had been vacant for over 25 years before being bought by developer Taylor Megdal of Megdal and Associates to upgrade it into a 2,285 square-foot boutique hotel, restaurant, and cafe. The hotel plans to open in 2019 with six guest rooms on the second floor.

== Architecture and design ==
The Norma Triangle is architecturally significant for its collection of "remodeled stucco bungalows" that define the "Hollywood Regency" and "inside-out" styles of the mid-20th century. Architectural critic John Chase identified the neighborhood as a primary site where 1920s Spanish Colonial Revival and English Cottage homes were theatrically redesigned to reflect the status and identity of the West Hollywood design community. Common features in the neighborhood include "Woolf-style" oversized entry doors, Mansard roofs, and the use of exterior ornaments such as urns and finials to create "stage-set" illusions.

== Earthquake Fault Zone ==
A significant portion of the Norma Triangle neighborhood falls within the Hollywood Earthquake Fault Zone which runs from West Hollywood east to Atwater.

According to WeHoVille, "In 2001, the City of West Hollywood identified two zones around the fault for which special rules were put in place for new development. Fault protection zone 1 includes land where an active fault is likely, and thus developers of new projects must conduct the fault rupture investigation. Fault protection zone 2 is an area less likely to contain a fault. Rather than conduct a fault rupture investigation in zone 2, a developer can reinforce a building’s foundation to protect it from an earthquake shake.

The revised state map places lots on the north side of Sunset Boulevard from Londonderry Place on the west to Sweetzer Avenue on the east in the “fault rupture investigation” zone. Further west, the revised state map now includes lots on the south side of Sunset between Hammond Street and San Vicente Boulevard.

In the Norma Triangle neighborhood, the state map also extends the FP1 zone over Cynthia Avenue, adding the area bordered on the south by West Vista Grande Street, on the west by Doheny Drive and on the east by North Hilldale Avenue."

== Norma Triangle In Literature ==
With many of the original homes built in the 1920s during the beginning of Hollywood and with many workers (e.g. actors, set designers, directors) from the studios living in the area, Norma Triangle is mentioned in books about Hollywood's history.

Under The Rainbow: An Intimate Memoir of Judy Garland, Rick Hudson & My Life in Old Hollywood by John Carlyle (2006)

"The first time I saw John Carlyle was at dusk on Norma Place in Los Angeles in the early ‘60s, just as the sun had faded and night was about to take over. I had been visiting a friend who had recently moved to the area, not far from where I lived on Hammond. But where is my street was like thousand others in the area, Norma Place had personality. It was a street where one expected to see colorful, eccentric, theatrical people, a place where it was readily evident that you weren’t in Kansas anymore.”

== Notable people ==
Dorothy Parker, an American poet, writer, critic, wit, and satirist. She lived with her husband Alan Campbell at 8983 Norma Place from 1957 to 1963.

Alan K. Campbell, an American writer, stage actor, and screenwriter.

Dolly Parton, singer songwriter. She lived in 9060 Harland Ave.

Natalie Wood, American actress. She lived in 9060 Harland Ave.

Christopher Isherwood (1904–1986), novelist, and Don Bachardy (b. 1934), portrait artist; the couple lived at 333 North Hilldale Avenue during the 1950s. Their residence served as a prominent social hub for the era's literary and artistic community, hosting figures such as Aldous Huxley, Tennessee Williams, and Igor Stravinsky.

== See also ==
- West Hollywood, California
- Los Angeles, California
- Sunset Strip
