= Models of abnormality =

Models of abnormality are general hypotheses as to the nature of psychological abnormalities. The four main models to explain psychological abnormality are the biological, behavioural, cognitive, and psychodynamic models. They all attempt to explain the causes and treatments for all psychological illnesses, and all from a different approach.

== Biological (medical) model ==
The biological model of abnormality (the only model not based on psychological principles) is based on the assumptions that if the brain, neuroanatomy and related biochemicals are all physical entities and work together to mediate psychological processes, then treating any mental abnormality must be physical/biological. Part of this theory stems from much research into the major neurotransmitter, serotonin, which seems to show that major psychological illnesses such as bipolar disorder and anorexia nervosa are caused by abnormally reduced levels of Serotonin in the brain. The model also suggests that psychological illness could and should be treated like any physical illness (being caused by chemical imbalance, microbes or physical stress) and hence can be treated with surgery or drugs. Electroconvulsive therapy has also proved to be a successful short-term treatment for depressive symptoms of bipolar disorder and related illnesses, although the reasons for its success are almost entirely unknown. There is also evidence for a genetic factor in causing psychological illness. The main cures for psychological illness under this model: electroconvulsive therapy, drugs, and surgery at times can have excellent results in restoring "normality" as biology has been shown to play some role in psychological illness. However, they can also have consequences, whether biology is responsible or not, as drugs always have a chance of causing allergic reactions or addiction. Electrotherapy can cause unnecessary stress, and surgery can dull the personality, as the part of the brain responsible for emotion (hypothalamus) is often altered or even completely removed.

=== Evaluation of the biological (medical) model ===
A diagnosis of mental 'illness' implies that a person is in no way responsible for the abnormality of functioning and, as such, is not to blame. The concept of 'no blame' is generally considered more humane and likely to elicit a more sympathetic response from others.

However, Zarate (1972) pointed out that even more than physical illness, mental illness is something that people fear – mainly because it is something they do not understand. In general, people do not know how to respond to someone diagnosed as mentally ill. There may also be fears that the person's behaviour might be unpredictable or potentially dangerous. Therefore, sympathy is more likely to give way to the avoidance of the person, which in turn leads to the person feeling shunned.

A considerable amount of research has been carried out within the medical model framework, which has dramatically increased our understanding of the possible biological factors underpinning psychological disorders. However, much of the evidence is inconclusive, and findings can be challenging to interpret. For example, in family studies, it is difficult to disentangle the effects of genetics from the effects of the environment. It can also be difficult to establish cause and effect. For example, raised levels of dopamine may be a consequence rather than a cause of schizophrenia.

Many psychologists criticise psychiatry for focusing its attention primarily on symptoms and for assuming that relieving symptoms with drugs cures the problem. Unfortunately, in many cases, when the drug treatment is ceased, the symptoms recur. This suggests that drugs are not addressing the true cause of the problem.

== Behavioral model ==
The behavioural model assumes that all maladaptive behaviour is essentially acquired through one's environment. Therefore, psychiatrists practising the beliefs of this model would prioritise changing behaviour over identifying the cause of the dysfunctional behaviour. The main solution to psychological illness under this model is aversion therapy, where the stimulus that provokes the dysfunctional behaviour is coupled with a second stimulus, with aims to produce a new reaction to the first stimulus based on the experiences of the second. Also, systematic desensitisation can be used, especially where phobias are involved by using the phobia that currently causes the dysfunctional behaviour and coupling it with a phobia that produces a more intense reaction. This is meant to make the first phobia seem less fearsome etc. as it has been put in comparison with the second phobia. This model seems to have been quite successful, where phobias and compulsive disorders are concerned, but it doesn't focus on the cause of the illness or problem, and so risks recurrence of the problem.

=== Evaluation of the behavioural model ===
The behavioural model overcomes the ethical issues raised by the medical model of labeling someone as 'ill' or 'abnormal'. Instead, the model concentrates on behaviour and whether it is 'adaptive' or 'maladaptive'. The model also allows individual and cultural differences to be taken into account. Provided the behaviour is presenting no problems to the individual or to other people, then there is no need to regard the behaviour as a mental disorder. Those who support the psychodynamic model, however, claim the behavioural model focuses only on symptoms and ignores the causes of abnormal behaviour. They claim that the symptoms are merely the outward expression of deeper underlying emotional problems. Whenever symptoms are treated without any attempt to ascertain the deeper underlying problems, then the problem will only manifest itself in another way, through different symptoms. This is known as symptom substitution. Behaviourists reject this criticism and claim that we need not look beyond the behavioural symptoms as the symptoms are the disorder. Thus, there is nothing to be gained from searching for internal causes, either psychological or physical. Behaviourists point to the success of behavioural therapies in treating certain disorders. Others note the effects of such treatments are not always long-lasting. Another criticism of the behavioural model is the ethical issues it raises. Some claim the therapies are dehumanising and unethical. For example, aversion therapy has been imposed on people without consent.

== Cognitive model ==
The cognitive model of abnormality focuses on the cognitive distortions or the dysfunctions in the thought processes and the cognitive deficiencies, particularly the absence of sufficient thinking and planning. This model holds that these variables are the cause of many psychological disorders and that psychologists following this outlook explain abnormality in terms of irrational and negative thinking with the main position that thinking determines all behaviour.

The cognitive model of abnormality is one of the dominant forces in academic psychology beginning in the 1970s and its appeal is partly attributed to the way it emphasizes the evaluation of internal mental processes such as perception, attention, memory, and problem-solving. The process allows psychologists to explain the development of mental disorders and the link between cognition and brain function especially to develop therapeutic techniques and interventions.

When it comes to the treatment of abnormal behavior or mental disorder, the cognitive model is quite similar to the behavioural model but with the main difference that, instead of teaching the patient to behave differently, it teaches the patient to think differently. It is hoped that if the patient's feelings and emotions towards something are influenced to change, it will induce external behavioural change. Though similar in ways to the behavioural model, therapists working with this model use differing methods for cures. One key assumption in cognitive therapy is that treatment should include helping people restructure their thoughts so that they think more positively about themselves, their life, and their future.

One of the main treatments is rational emotive therapy (RET), which is based on the principle that an "activating" emotional event will cause a change in thoughts toward that situation, even if it is an illogical thought. So with this therapy, it is the therapist's job to question and change the irrational thoughts. It is similar to the behavioural model where its success is concerned, as it has also proved to be quite successful in the treatment of compulsive disorders and phobias. Although it does not deal with the cause of the problem directly, it does attempt to change the situation more broadly than the behavioural model. Due to their respective characteristics and similarities, there are instances when psychologists combine cognitive and behavioural models to treat mental disorders.

== Psychodynamic model ==
The psychodynamic model is the fourth psychological model of abnormality and is based on the work of Sigmund Freud. It is based on the principles that psychological illnesses come about from repressed emotions and thoughts from experiences in the past (usually childhood), and as a result of this repression, alternative behaviour replaces what is being repressed. The patient is believed to be cured when they can admit that which is currently being repressed (4)^{[usurped]}. The main cure for illnesses under this model is free association where the patient is free to speak while the psychiatrist notes down and tries to interpret where the trouble areas are. This model can be successful, especially where the patient feels comfortable to speak freely and about issues that are relevant to a cure.
