= Speech Acts (book) =

1969 book on speech act theory by John R. Searle

Speech Acts: An Essay in the Philosophy of Language
- Cover of the first edition
- Author: John R. Searle
- Language: English
- Subject: Philosophy of language, pragmatics, speech act
- Genre: Non-fiction
- Publisher: Cambridge University Press
- Publication date: 1969
- Publication place: United States
- Media type: Print (hardback and paperback)
- Pages: 203
- ISBN: 978-0-521-09626-3
- OCLC: 18484634

Speech Acts: An Essay in the Philosophy of Language is a 1969 book by the American philosopher John R. Searle. In it Searle develops a systematic account of speech acts, building on the pioneering work of J. L. Austin and other figures in ordinary language philosophy. The book advances the view that speaking a language is a kind of rule-governed behaviour and that the basic units of linguistic communication are not sentences or propositions but the various kinds of things speakers do with words.

Since its publication Speech Acts has been regarded as a classic of analytic philosophy and a foundational text for modern speech act theory and linguistic pragmatics. It has influenced later work in philosophy of language, linguistics, communication studies, legal theory and other disciplines concerned with language and action.

== Background and publication ==
Searle studied at Oxford in the 1950s, where he attended Austin's lectures and was influenced by Austin's then-unpublished work on performative utterances and speech acts. His Oxford dissertation on the theory of descriptions and proper names already contained an "incipient treatment" of speech acts, which he subsequently developed in a series of articles in the 1960s before reworking the material into a book-length study. Early papers such as "Austin on Locutionary and Illocutionary Acts" (1968) helped prepare the ground for the more general framework presented in Speech Acts.

According to the preface, Searle regarded the book as an attempt to combine insights from Austin with work by philosophers such as Paul Grice and John Rawls, while pursuing his own project of giving a systematic theory of illocutionary acts and the rules that underlie them. Cambridge University Press published the first hardback edition in 1969; the work has since been reissued in paperback and as an e-book, with later printings giving a page count of around 214 pages.

From the outset Speech Acts was positioned as a contribution not only to philosophy of language but to a broader reorientation in post-war analytic philosophy, sometimes described as the "linguistic-pragmatic turn", in which questions about meaning, truth and rationality are approached through the analysis of language use. Searle later continued and extended the project of Speech Acts in his collection Expression and Meaning: Studies in the Theory of Speech Acts (1979), many of whose essays were originally conceived as chapters of a larger work on speech act theory.

== Overview ==
=== Structure and contents ===
Speech Acts is divided into two parts. Part I, titled "A Theory of Speech Acts", sets out Searle's general framework and contains five chapters: "Methods and Scope", "Expressions, Meaning and Speech Acts", "The Structure of Illocutionary Acts", "Reference as a Speech Act" and "Predication". Part II, "Some Applications of the Theory", contains three chapters: "Three Fallacies in Contemporary Philosophy", "Problems of Reference" and "Deriving 'Ought' from 'Is'".

In Part I Searle argues that the fundamental units of linguistic communication are not mere sentences or propositions but the illocutionary acts performed in uttering them. He introduces the distinction between illocutionary force and propositional content, analyses the structure of illocutionary acts through the example of promising, and suggests that referring and predicating can be understood as kinds of speech acts rather than purely semantic relations.

Part II applies the theory to contemporary debates. Searle criticises what he takes to be three widespread "fallacies" in analytic philosophy concerning meaning and use, offers a speech-act-based treatment of problems of reference, and revisits the question of how, if at all, one can derive "ought" from "is" by treating obligations as products of certain institutionalised speech acts.

== Themes and arguments ==
=== Speech acts and rules ===
A central theme of the book is that speaking a language is engaging in a rule-governed form of behaviour. Searle distinguishes between regulative rules, which regulate antecedently existing activities (such as driving or playing football), and constitutive rules, which do not merely regulate but partly create the activities they govern (as in the rules of chess). He argues that many social and linguistic phenomena, including promising and asserting, exist only in virtue of sets of such constitutive rules.

On Searle's view each type of illocutionary act is defined by a system of rules specifying, among other things, the appropriate propositional content, the circumstances in which the act can be performed, the psychological state it expresses and its essential point. In his detailed analysis of promising he distinguishes propositional content conditions, preparatory conditions, a sincerity condition (the speaker intends to do what is promised) and an essential condition stating that the utterance counts as the undertaking of an obligation.

=== Illocutionary force and propositional content ===
Searle introduces a distinction between the illocutionary force of an utterance and its propositional content. Roughly, the propositional content concerns what is being talked about, while the illocutionary force concerns what the speaker is doing in making the utterance—stating, questioning, commanding, warning, and so on. Two sentences can therefore share the same content but differ in force, as when a declarative statement is contrasted with a corresponding question or imperative.

This distinction allows Searle to offer a more fine-grained account of Austin's locutionary/illocutionary/perlocutionary triad. Illocutionary acts are characterised primarily by their force and by the conditions under which they are satisfied or successful, while perlocutionary effects (such as persuading or frightening) are treated as contingent results of the performance of an illocutionary act rather than as part of its conventional structure.

=== Meaning, intention and convention ===
A further theme of the book is the relation between linguistic meaning, speaker intention and social convention. Drawing on and extending Grice's work on meaning, Searle argues that the meaning of an utterance is determined both by the conventional meaning of the expressions used and by the underlying illocutionary rules that connect those expressions with particular kinds of acts. He maintains that illocutionary acts are typically performed by means of illocutionary force indicating devices (such as sentence mood, word order and performative verbs) in conjunction with the shared rules of a language.

Searle's analysis of promising and other speech acts is intended to show how normative notions such as obligation, responsibility and commitment can arise from rule-governed linguistic performances. On this view, for example, the fact that someone is under an obligation to pay a debt can be traced to the successful performance of certain speech acts (such as explicit promises or contractual declarations) in appropriate institutional contexts.

=== Applications: reference and the 'ought'/'is' problem ===
In the chapters on reference Searle argues that referring to objects is not merely a matter of standing in a semantic relation but itself a kind of speech act governed by rules about the use of referring expressions in context. He criticises purely descriptive or causal theories of reference for neglecting the role of speaker intentions and conversational background in fixing what is referred to.

The final chapter, "Deriving 'Ought' from 'Is'", re-examines David Hume's is–ought problem, about inferring normative statements from purely descriptive ones. Searle argues that once one recognises that certain "is"-statements describe the performance of institutional speech acts—for example, the making of a promise—then, given the constitutive rules of those acts, certain "ought"-statements (such as claims about the obligations thereby undertaken) follow logically from them.

== Reception and influence ==
=== Contemporary reception ===
Speech Acts was widely and, on the whole, favourably reviewed in the years following its publication. Reviews in journals such as The Philosophical Quarterly, Dialogue and Metaphilosophy praised the book's clarity and ambition while raising detailed objections to aspects of Searle's theory of rules, meaning and reference. A review in The Philosophical Quarterly characterised the book as a major contribution to the philosophy of language and as the most substantial discussion of speech acts since Austin's How to Do Things with Words.

R. M. Hare's 1970 article "Meaning and Speech Acts" in The Philosophical Review engaged critically with Searle's proposals, helping to place the book at the centre of subsequent debates about the relation between sentence meaning and illocutionary force. Other early responses, such as L. Jonathan Cohen's "Searle's Theory of Speech Acts", examined the logical structure of Searle's account and questioned the adequacy of some of his classifications.

=== Philosophy and linguistics ===
Speech Acts is often treated, together with Austin's How to Do Things with Words, as one of the founding texts of contemporary speech act theory. Searle's framework has influenced a wide range of subsequent work in philosophy of language and mind, including his own later writings on intentionality, consciousness and social ontology, as well as theories of conversational implicature, indirect speech acts and communicative competence.

In linguistics and pragmatics Searle's ideas have been used to analyse conversational structure, politeness, discourse markers and classroom interaction, among other topics. His notion of illocutionary force, the classification of illocutionary points and the use of felicity conditions as analytical tools have been especially influential in work on pragmatics, sociolinguistics and discourse analysis.

Searle's taxonomy of illocutionary acts—developed more fully in later works but rooted in the analysis of Speech Acts—has also shaped debates about the "direction of fit" between words and world, the nature of assertion, and the role of psychological states such as belief and intention in determining illocutionary force.

=== Criticism and further developments ===
While widely influential, Searle's account has also been the target of sustained criticism. Some commentators have argued that his rule-based, intention-centred approach does not adequately capture the role of power, social structure and conversational dynamics in the performance and interpretation of speech acts. Others have questioned whether illocutionary force can be systematically classified by a small set of dimensions such as illocutionary point, direction of fit and sincerity condition.

Critics have also challenged Searle's attempt to derive "ought" from "is" via the constitutive rules of promising, and his treatment of indirect speech acts, metaphor and fiction—topics he himself later revisited in Expression and Meaning and subsequent writings. Nonetheless, even critical discussions typically take Speech Acts as a primary reference point, and the book continues to serve as an introduction to the speech-act-theoretic approach to language for students and researchers.

== Editions and translations ==
=== English editions ===
- 1969: John R. Searle, Speech Acts: An Essay in the Philosophy of Language, Cambridge University Press, Cambridge. First hardback edition.
- Subsequent paperback and digital editions by Cambridge University Press, including reprints on Cambridge Core and electronic editions with updated pagination.

=== Translations ===
Speech Acts has been translated into several languages, including:

- German: Sprechakte: ein sprachphilosophischer Essay, trans. R. and R. Wiggershaus, Suhrkamp Verlag, Frankfurt am Main, 1971 (Theorie series; later paperback reprints).
- French: Les actes de langage: Essai de philosophie du langage, Hermann, Paris, 1972 (Collection Savoir).
- Italian: Atti linguistici. Saggio di filosofia del linguaggio, Einaudi / Boringhieri, Turin, 1976.
- Spanish: Actos de habla: ensayos de filosofía del lenguaje, Cátedra, Madrid, 1980; later reprints and editions by Cátedra and other publishers.
- Other translations include Dutch (Taal-handelingen, een taalfilosofisch essay) and Portuguese editions, reflecting the book's wide international circulation.

== See also ==
- John Searle
- J. L. Austin
- How to Do Things with Words
- Speech act
- Illocutionary act
- Perlocutionary act
- Pragmatics
- Ordinary language philosophy
- Expression and Meaning
