= How to Do Things with Words =

1955 lecture series on speech acts by J. L. Austin

- Title page
- Author: J. L. Austin
- Language: English
- Series: William James Lectures
- Subject: Philosophy of language, pragmatics, ordinary language philosophy
- Genre: Non-fiction
- Publisher: Clarendon Press (UK); Harvard University Press (US)
- Publication date: 1962
- Publication place: United Kingdom
- Media type: Print (hardback and paperback)
- Pages: 166 (1st ed.), 168 (2nd ed.)
- ISBN: 978-0-19-824553-7
- OCLC: 898913803

How to Do Things with Words is a posthumously published book of lectures by the English philosopher J. L. Austin. First issued in 1962 by Clarendon Press and Harvard University Press, it is based on the William James Lectures that Austin delivered at Harvard University in 1955. The work is widely regarded as the founding text of speech act theory and a classic of ordinary language philosophy and linguistic pragmatics.

In the lectures Austin introduces and develops the notion of a performative utterance, analyses the conditions under which such utterances are happy or unhappy, and ultimately replaces the simple contrast between constative and performative sentences with a more general theory of locutionary, illocutionary and perlocutionary acts. The book has had a lasting impact on philosophy, linguistics, literary theory, legal theory and other disciplines concerned with language and communication.

== Background and publication ==
Austin developed his ideas about speech and action over several decades. He reports that the views underlying the lectures were already in place by 1939 and were first used in his 1946 paper "Other Minds". In the early 1950s he delivered a series of Oxford lectures under the title "Words and Deeds", revising his notes each year. The 1955 William James Lectures at Harvard were prepared from a further reworked set of notes that covered similar ground but in a more systematic way.

Austin died in 1960, before preparing the lectures for publication. The 1962 volume was edited from his notes by the Oxford philosopher J. O. Urmson, who supplied an editorial preface explaining the textual history. A corrected and expanded second edition, edited by Urmson and Marina Sbisà, was published in 1975; the editors returned to Austin's original materials, making numerous small emendations and adding an appendix of marginal notes that had not been incorporated into the first edition.

The text that readers encounter is therefore effectively a lightly edited set of lecture notes rather than a monograph that Austin himself would have published in that form. Commentators have stressed that this helps to explain both the informal, example-driven style of the work and some of its apparent tensions and unfinished lines of thought.

The book has since appeared in numerous printings and has been translated into several languages, including French (Quand dire, c'est faire), Spanish (Cómo hacer cosas con palabras), German (Zur Theorie der Sprechakte) and Chinese. Austin's manuscripts and lecture notes relating to the work are held in the Bodleian Library, Oxford.

== Overview ==
=== Constatives and performatives ===
Austin begins by challenging a long-standing assumption in philosophy: that the primary business of sentences is to describe the world and that their main logical feature is to be true or false. In everyday life, he observes, we also use sentences to do things, not just to say things, and in such cases the usual tests of truth and falsity seem misplaced.

His most famous initial examples are utterances such as "I name this ship the Queen Elizabeth" spoken during a christening, or "I do" in a marriage ceremony. These formulae do not merely describe an act of naming or marrying; when uttered in appropriate circumstances by the right person, they are the act. Austin calls such expressions performative utterances or simply performatives.

Performatives are not, according to Austin, properly evaluated as true or false. Instead, they are subject to conditions of felicity: to succeed, certain conventional and contextual requirements must be met (for example, the speaker must have the proper authority, the procedure must be correctly executed, and the participants must be sincere). Where these conditions fail, the performative is unhappy or infelicitous rather than false.

Austin contrasts performatives with constatives, utterances that appear to serve primarily to state facts and so to admit of truth or falsity. Much of the early part of the book is devoted to exploring this contrast and to undermining the idea that there is a clear and fundamental division between constative and performative uses of language.

=== Felicity conditions and infelicities ===
Austin distinguishes several ways in which performatives can misfire or be "unhappy". Some failures are due to violations of the conventional procedure itself (for example, attempting to baptize a penguin with a bottle of beer in an informal setting). Others involve abuses, in which the procedure is correctly followed but the speaker lacks the requisite sincerity or intentions.

He analyses these failures in a quasi-legal vocabulary—distinguishing, for example, between misinvocations of a procedure, misexecutions, and abuses—and suggests that attention to such nuances can dissolve philosophical puzzles about meaning, truth and responsibility. The detailed typology of infelicities, however, also contributes to the sense—reinforced later in the book—that the initial performative/constative distinction cannot be sustained in its original form.

=== From performatives to speech acts ===
Having explored the performative–constative contrast and the conditions under which performatives succeed or fail, Austin announces a "fresh start". Rather than focusing on a special class of performative sentences, he turns to the many different things we do when we utter any sentence at all.

He proposes that in making an utterance, we typically perform at least three distinct but related kinds of act:

- a locutionary act: producing a meaningful linguistic expression (involving what he calls the phonetic act of making certain sounds, the phatic act of using them as words of a language, and the rhetic act of using those words with a definite sense and reference);
- an illocutionary act: performing a conventional act in saying something, such as asserting, promising, warning, ordering, apologising or congratulating;
- a perlocutionary act: producing certain effects by saying something, such as persuading, alarming, amusing, or annoying one's audience.

This threefold distinction allows Austin to explain how the same words, uttered with the same literal meaning, can be used with different forces and can have different consequences in different contexts. It also makes it possible to treat "ordinary" assertions as just one among many illocutionary act types, rather than as the paradigm of meaningful language.

=== Illocutionary force and the taxonomy of speech acts ===
In the later lectures, Austin attempts to classify illocutionary acts by examining the verbs we use to name them and the characteristic force-indicating devices associated with them (mood, word order, performative verbs, and so on). He sketches a tentative taxonomy that includes at least five broad groups of illocutionary verbs:

- verdictives, such as "acquit", "grade" or "estimate";
- exercitives, such as "order", "advise" or "appoint";
- commissives, such as "promise" or "guarantee";
- behabitives, such as "apologise", "thank" or "congratulate";
- expositives, such as "argue", "concede" or "clarify".

Austin himself expresses dissatisfaction with this scheme and presents it as a starting point rather than a finished classification. Subsequent speech act theorists, notably John Searle, developed alternative taxonomies that were intended to be more systematic while still drawing heavily on Austin's distinctions.

== Contents ==
How to Do Things with Words is composed of twelve lectures. The first half of the book is primarily concerned with the performative/constative distinction and the analysis of felicity conditions; the second half develops the theory of speech acts and the illocutionary–perlocutionary distinction.

A schematic overview of the lectures is as follows (lecture titles are not given by Austin himself but are commonly used by commentators):

- Lecture I introduces the challenge to the "descriptive" view of language and presents the initial examples of performative utterances.
- Lecture II refines the notion of performatives, distinguishes explicit from implicit performatives, and develops the idea of felicity conditions.
- Lecture III discusses further kinds of infelicity and raises worries about the neat separation of performatives from constatives.
- Lecture IV considers "behabitives" and the role of tone, gesture and other features in the performance of speech acts.
- Lecture V and Lecture VI continue the scrutiny of the performative/constative contrast and prepare the way for Austin's "fresh start".
- Lecture VII introduces the threefold distinction between locutionary, illocutionary and perlocutionary acts.
- Lecture VIII and Lecture IX explore illocutionary force, conventionality and context, including cases of indirect speech acts.
- Lecture X and Lecture XI examine ways of identifying illocutionary verbs and discuss the "in saying" / "by saying" formulas as tests.
- Lecture XII offers a tentative classification of illocutionary acts and briefly reflects on the limits of the project.

== Themes and arguments ==
=== Against a purely descriptive view of language ===
One of Austin's central themes is that the dominant philosophical picture of language as primarily a vehicle for stating facts is deeply misleading. Performatives show, in a particularly vivid way, that utterances can be actions governed by social conventions rather than mere carriers of truth-conditions. Austin argues that once we recognise this, it becomes harder to sustain the idea of a sharp boundary between descriptive and non-descriptive uses of language: even apparently straightforward assertions can inherit features of performatives, such as felicity conditions and commitments.

=== Locution, illocution and perlocution ===
Austin's tripartite distinction has become a standard point of reference in speech act theory. Locutionary acts concern what is linguistically said, illocutionary acts concern what is done in saying something (asserting, ordering, promising, etc.), and perlocutionary acts concern what is achieved by saying something (convincing, frightening, amusing, and so on).

Later theorists have debated the boundaries between these categories, the extent to which illocutionary forces can be formalised, and the role of speaker intentions versus social conventions in fixing the force of an utterance. Austin's own treatment is deliberately exploratory and occasionally ambivalent, but it set the agenda for much subsequent work in the philosophy of language and linguistics.

=== Formalisation and the limits of systematisation ===
Although Austin occasionally hints at the possibility of a more formal treatment of speech acts and alludes to work by colleagues such as David Kaplan on demonstratives, his own approach stays close to ordinary examples and resists simple formal schematisation. This methodological stance has inspired both admiration and criticism: some see it as a salutary reminder of the complexity of ordinary language, while others regard it as an obstacle to developing a rigorous theory.

== Reception and influence ==
=== Philosophical and linguistic impact ===
How to Do Things with Words is one of the most widely cited works of twentieth-century Anglophone philosophy. It is commonly treated as the starting-point of modern speech act theory and has influenced fields as diverse as semantics, pragmatics, discourse analysis, sociolinguistics, and the study of conversation.

John Searle's book Speech Acts (1969) explicitly builds on Austin's framework, offering more systematic accounts of illocutionary force and taxonomies of speech acts. Later work in pragmatics and philosophy of language, including the development of theories of indirect speech acts, politeness, conversational implicature and communicative competence, often takes Austin's distinctions as a point of departure.

=== Literary theory and critical theory ===
The book has also been influential in literary studies and critical theory. J. Hillis Miller's Speech Acts in Literature (2002), for example, treats Austin's lectures as the "founding text of speech act theory" and explores the role of literary examples and narrative framings within them. Austin's insistence that literary utterances are typically "non-serious" and thus outside the main scope of his investigation has been a focal point for debates about the status of fiction and metaphor within speech act theory.

Jacques Derrida's essay "Signature Event Context" (1972) offers a critical reading of Austin's treatment of performatives, arguing that Austin underestimates the role of iterability, citation and writing in the functioning of speech acts. Derrida's critique prompted responses from Searle and others and helped to establish speech act theory as a central point of contact between so-called analytic and continental traditions.

=== Reassessments ===
Recent scholarship has sought to re-evaluate both the structure and the philosophical implications of How to Do Things with Words. Marina Sbisà has argued that the book is best read as a complex but unified exploration of how linguistic acts are embedded in broader forms of human action, rather than as a simple progression from performatives to illocutionary forces. Alice Crary has emphasised the work's critical stance toward correspondence theories of truth and its significance for ethics and social criticism.

Other commentators have explored the importance of Austin's analysis for education, social and political theory, feminist theory, and studies of performativity more generally.

== Editions ==
- 1962: J. L. Austin, How to Do Things with Words: The William James Lectures Delivered at Harvard University in 1955, ed. J. O. Urmson, Clarendon Press, Oxford; simultaneously published by Harvard University Press, Cambridge, Massachusetts.
- 1975: Second, revised edition, ed. J. O. Urmson and Marina Sbisà, Clarendon Press / Harvard University Press.
- Numerous later reprints and paperback editions by Oxford University Press and Harvard University Press.
