= Searle–Derrida debate =

Intellectual controversy

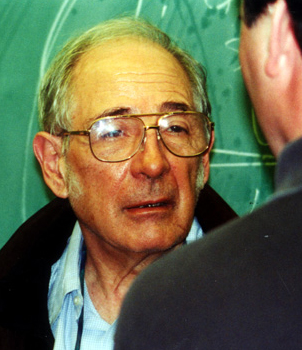
John Searle

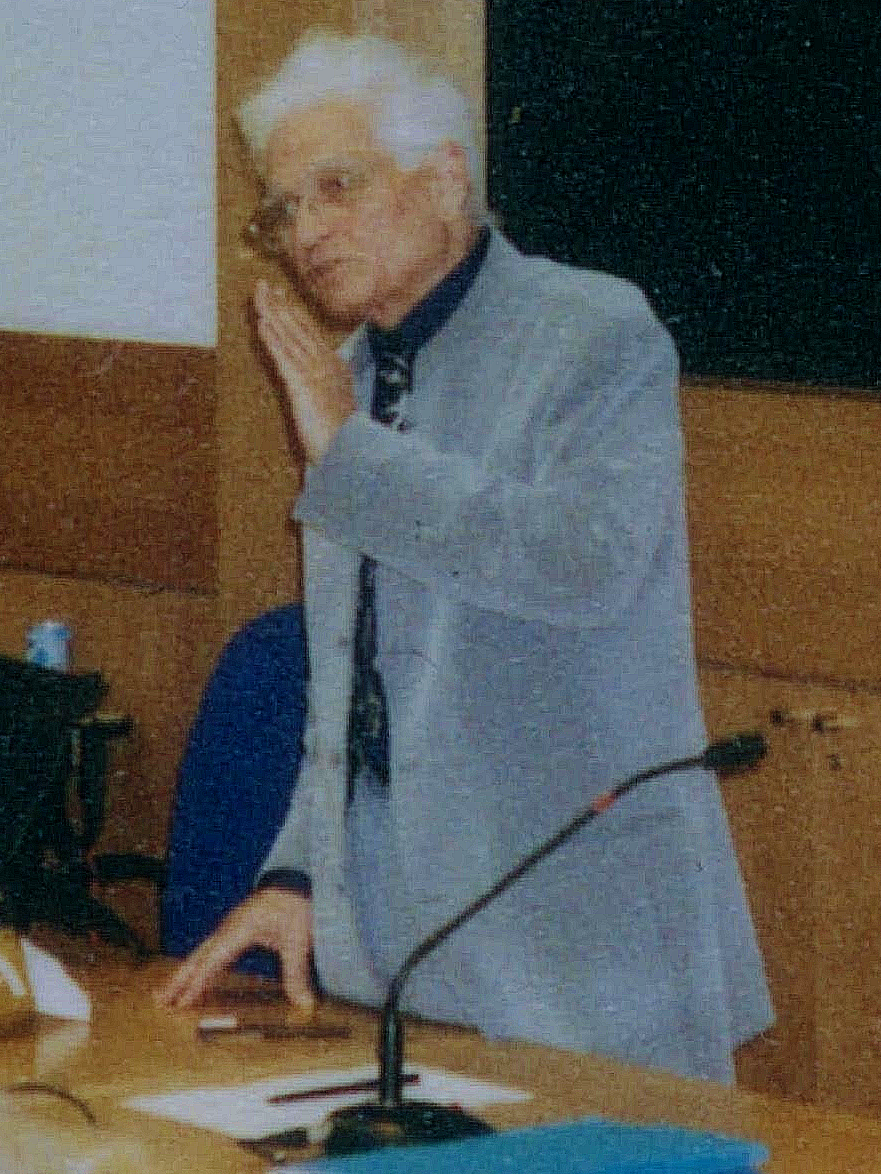
Jacques Derrida

The Searle–Derrida debate is a famous intellectual dispute opposing John Searle and Jacques Derrida, after Derrida responded to J. L. Austin's theory of the illocutionary act in his 1972 paper "Signature Event Context". In his 1977 essay Reiterating the Differences: A Reply to Derrida, Searle argued that Derrida's apparent rejection of Austin was unwarranted, but later refused to let this 1977 reply be printed along with Derrida's papers in the 1988 collection Limited Inc—in which a new text by Derrida responded to Searle's positions on the topic. In the 1990s, Searle clarified why he did not consider Derrida's approach to be legitimate philosophy.

Commentators have sometimes interpreted the seemingly failed nature of the exchange between Searle and Derrida as a prominent example of a confrontation between analytical and continental philosophy, some having considered it a series of elaborate misunderstandings while others have seen either Searle or Derrida gaining the upper hand. While the fundamental opposition between the two philosophers lay in their different understanding of intentionality, the debate is famous for its degree of mutual hostility, which can be seen from Searle's statement that "It would be a mistake to regard Derrida's discussion of Austin as a confrontation between two prominent philosophical traditions", to which Derrida replied that that sentence was "the only sentence of the 'reply' to which I can subscribe".

== "Signature Event Context" (1972) ==
Studying J. L. Austin's theory of the illocutionary act in the perspective of deconstruction, Derrida argued in his 1972 paper "Signature Event Context" that Austin had missed the fact that any speech event is framed by a "structure of absence" (the words that are left unsaid due to contextual constraints) and by "iterability" (the repeatability of linguistic elements outside of their context). He also took issue with the way Austin had excluded the study of fiction, non-serious or "parasitic" speech, wondering whether this exclusion was because Austin had considered these speech genres governed by different structures of meaning, or simply due to a lack of interest.

In other words, while sympathetic to Austin's departure from a purely denotational account of language to one that includes "force", Derrida was sceptical of the framework of normativity employed by Austin. He argued that the focus on intentionality in speech-act theory was misguided because intentionality is restricted to that which is already established as a possible intention.

== John Searle's reply ==
According to Searle's 1977 essay, Reiterating the Differences: A Reply to Derrida, Derrida assumed that Austin's theory promised to give a full account of language and meaning, when the theory's goal was in fact much narrower. Searle considered the narrow scope of Austin's inquiry to justify the omission of parasitic discourse forms. Searle also argued that Derrida's disagreement with Austin turned on his having misunderstood Austin's (and Peirce's) type–token distinction and his failure to understand Austin's concept of failure in relation to performativity.

Searle agreed with Derrida's proposal that intentionality presupposes iterability, but did not apply the same concept of intentionality used by Derrida, being unable or unwilling to engage with the continental conceptual apparatus. (This, in turn, would cause Derrida to criticize Searle for not being sufficiently familiar with phenomenological perspectives on intentionality.)

In 1983, Searle wrote in The New York Review of Books that he was surprised by "the low level of philosophical argumentation, the deliberate obscurantism of the prose, the wildly exaggerated claims, and the constant striving to give the appearance of profundity by making claims that seem paradoxical, but under analysis often turn out to be silly or trivial."

In 1994, Searle argued that the ideas upon which deconstruction is founded are essentially a consequence of a series of conceptual confusions made by Derrida as a result of his outdated knowledge or are merely banalities. He insisted that Derrida's conception of iterability and its alleged corrupting effect on meaning stems from Derrida's ignorance of the type–token distinction that exists in current linguistics and philosophy of language. As Searle explains, "Most importantly, from the fact that different tokens of a sentence type can be uttered on different occasions with different intentions, that is, different speaker meanings, nothing of any significance follows about the original speaker meaning of the original utterance token." The substance of Searle's criticism of Derrida in relation to topics in the philosophy of language—referenced in Derrida's Signature Event Context—was that Derrida had no apparent familiarity with contemporary philosophy of language nor of contemporary linguistics in Anglo-Saxon countries. Searle explains, "When Derrida writes about the philosophy of language he refers typically to Rousseau and Condillac, not to mention Plato. And his idea of a "modern linguist" is Benveniste or even Saussure." Searle describes Derrida's philosophical knowledge as pre-Wittgensteinian—that is to say, disconnected from analytic tradition—and consequently, in his perspective, naive and misguided, concerned with issues long-since resolved or otherwise found to be non-issues.

=== Derrida's response ===
Claiming that a clear sender of Searle's message could not be established, Derrida in Limited Inc suggested that Searle had formed with Austin a société à responsabilité limitée (a "limited liability company") due to the ways in which the ambiguities of authorship within Searle's reply circumvented the very speech act of his reply. Searle did not respond. Later in 1988, Derrida reviewed his position and his critiques of Austin and Searle, reiterating that he found the constant appeal to "normality" in the analytical tradition to be problematic, a practice of which they were only paradigmatic examples.

In the description of the structure called "normal", "normative", "central", "ideal", this possibility must be integrated as an essential possibility. The possibility cannot be treated as though it were a simple accident-marginal or parasitic. It cannot be, and hence ought not to be, and this passage from can to ought reflects the entire difficulty. In the analysis of so-called normal cases, one neither can nor ought, in all theoretical rigor, to exclude the possibility of transgression. Not even provisionally, or out of allegedly methodological considerations. It would be a poor method, since this possibility of transgression tells us immediately and indispensable about the structure of the act said to be normal as well as about the structure of law in general.

He continued arguing how problematic was establishing the relation between "nonfiction or standard discourse" and "fiction," defined as its "parasite", "for part of the most original essence of the latter is to allow fiction, the simulacrum, parasitism, to take place-and in so doing to 'de-essentialize' itself as it were". He would finally argue that the indispensable question would then become:

what is "nonfiction standard discourse," what must it be and what does this name evoke, once its fictionality or its fictionalization, its transgressive "parasitism," is always possible (and moreover by virtue of the very same words, the same phrases, the same grammar, etc.)? This question is all the more indispensable since the rules, and even the statements of the rules governing the relations of "nonfiction standard discourse" and its fictional "parasites," are not things found in nature, but laws, symbolic inventions, or conventions, institutions that, in their very normality as well as in their normativity, entail something of the fictional.

In the debate, Derrida praises Austin's work, but argues that he is wrong to banish what Austin calls "infelicities" from the "normal" operation of language. One "infelicity," for instance, occurs when it cannot be known whether a given speech act is "sincere" or "merely citational" (and therefore possibly ironic, etc.). Derrida argues that every iteration is necessarily "citational", due to the graphematic nature of speech and writing, and that language could not work at all without the ever-present and ineradicable possibility of such alternate readings. Derrida disagrees with Searle's attempt to get around this issue by grounding final authority in the speaker's inaccessible "intention". Derrida argues that intention cannot possibly govern how an iteration signifies, once it becomes hearable or readable. All speech acts borrow a language whose significance is determined by historical-linguistic context, and by the alternate possibilities that this context makes possible. This significance, Derrida argues, cannot be altered or governed by the whims of intention.

== Further comments by Searle ==
According to Searle, the consistent pattern of Derrida's rhetoric is:

(a) announce a preposterous thesis, e.g. "there is no outside-text" (il n'y a pas de hors-texte);
(b) when challenged on (a) respond that you have been misunderstood and revise the claim in (a) such that it becomes a truism, e.g. "'il n'y a pas de hors-texte' means nothing else: there is nothing outside contexts";
(c) when the reformulation from (b) is acknowledged then proceed as if the original formulation from (a) was accepted. The revised idea—for example that everything exists in some context—is a banality, but a charade ensues as if the original claim—nothing exists outside of text—had been established.

In 1995, Searle gave a brief reply to Derrida in The Construction of Social Reality. He called Derrida's conclusion "preposterous" and stated that "Derrida, as far as I can tell, does not have an argument. He simply declares that there is nothing outside of texts (Il n'y a pas de 'hors-texte')." Then, in Limited Inc., Derrida "apparently takes it all back", claiming that he meant only "the banality that everything exists in some context or other!" Derrida and others like him present "an array of weak or even nonexistent arguments for a conclusion that seems preposterous".

== See also ==
- Citationality
- Documentality
- John Searle#Intentionality and the background
- Science wars
- Chomsky-Foucault debate
- Habermas-Foucault debate
- J. L. Austin – English philosopher (1911–1960)
  - Performative utterance – Category of utterances in philosophy of language
  - Speech act – Utterance that serves a performative function
  - Locutionary act – Performance of an utterance, in linguistics
  - Illocutionary act – Linguistic term coined by J. L. Austin
  - Perlocutionary act – Effect of an utterance on an interlocutor
- Authorial intentionalism – Author's intent as it is encoded in their work
- Intention – Mental state denoting commitment to act
