= Felicity (pragmatics) =

Whether or not a unit of speech is relevant in its context

In linguistics and philosophy of language, an utterance is felicitous if it is pragmatically well-formed. An utterance can be infelicitous because it is self-contradictory, trivial, irrelevant, or because it is somehow inappropriate for the context of utterance. Researchers in semantics and pragmatics use felicity judgments much as syntacticians use grammaticality judgments. An infelicitous sentence is marked with an pound sign.

The terms felicitous and infelicitous were first proposed by J. L. Austin as part of his theory of speech acts. In his thinking, a performative utterance is neither true nor false, but can instead be deemed felicitous or infelicitous according to a set of conditions whose interpretation differs depending on whether the utterance in question is a declaration ("I sentence you to death"), a request ("I ask that you stop doing that") or a warning ("I warn you not to jump off the roof").

== Felicity conditions for declarations ==
- Conventionality of procedure: the procedure (e.g. an oath) follows its conventional form
- Appropriate participants and circumstances: the participants are able to perform a felicitous speech act under the circumstances (e.g. a judge can sentence a criminal in court, but not on the street)
- Complete execution: the speaker completes the speech act without errors or interruptions

== Felicity conditions for requests ==
- Propositional content condition: the requested act is a future act of the hearer
- Preparatory precondition: 1) the speaker believes the hearer can perform the requested act; 2) it is not obvious that the hearer would perform the requested act without being asked
- Sincerity condition: the speaker genuinely wants the hearer to perform the requested act
- Essential condition: the utterance counts as an attempt by the speaker to have the hearer do an act

== Felicity conditions for warnings ==
- Propositional content condition: it is a future event
- Preparatory precondition: 1) the speaker believes the event will occur and be detrimental to the hearer; 2) the speaker believes that it is not obvious to the hearer that the event will occur
- Sincerity condition: the speaker genuinely believes that the event will be detrimental to the hearer
- Essential condition: the utterance counts as an attempt by the speaker to have the hearer recognize that a future event will be detrimental

== See also ==
- John Searle
- Illocutionary act
- Pragmatics
