= Nick Fotion =

American Philosopher

Nicholas Fotion

Education
- Education: University of North Carolina, Chapel Hill
- Academic advisor: John Searle

Philosophical work
- Era: Contemporary philosophy
- Region: Western philosophy
- Main interests: Moral Philosophy; Just war theory; Intentionality · Social reality

Nicholas George Fotion (September 18, 1927 – 2019) was an American philosopher noted for his contributions to the philosophy of ethics and philosophy of language. He has written on military ethics, terrorism, and just war theory. He has also worked on the speech act theory of John Searle and J.L. Austin. He was professor emeritus at Emory University.

Fotion was born in Cedar Rapids, Iowa, in 1927. He died in Atlanta, Georgia, in December 2019.
