= DCT =

DCT may refer to:

== Science and technology ==
- DCT (videocassette format), a videocassette format developed by Ampex
- Discovery Channel Telescope, former name of the Lowell Discovery Telescope, US
- Dual-clutch transmission, a vehicle technology which allows gears to be selected in fully manual or automatic mode

=== Biology and medicine ===
- Direct Coombs test, used to test for autoimmune hemolytic anemia
- Distal convoluted tubule, a part of the functional unit of the kidney
- Dopachrome tautomerase, a human gene

=== Mathematics ===
- Discrete cosine transform, a mathematical transform related to the Fourier transform and widely used in digital data compression
- Dominated convergence theorem, a central mathematical theorem in the theory of integration first proposed by Henri Lebesgue

== Other uses ==
- Death Come True, a 2020 adventure video game
- Director Control Tower, a facility equipped to direct and control a ship's gun battery
- Discourse-completion task, a pragmatics research method in linguistics
- Dreams Come True (band), a Japanese band
- Danescourt railway station (National Rail station code), Wales
- Divine command theory, a meta-ethical theory

== See also ==
- Motorola DCT2000, a set-top-box device used for receiving digital cable TV
