= Locutionary act =

Performance of an utterance, in linguistics

In linguistics and the philosophy of language, a locutionary act is the performance of an utterance, and is one of the types of force, in addition to illocutionary act and perlocutionary act, typically cited in Speech Act Theory. Speech Act Theory is a subfield of pragmatics that explores how words and sentences are not only used to present information, but also to perform actions. As an utterance, a locutionary act is considered a performative, in which both the audience and the speaker must trust certain conditions about the speech act. These conditions are called felicity conditions and are divided into three different categories: the essential condition, the sincerity condition, and the preparatory condition.

The term equally refers to the surface meaning of an utterance because, according to J. L. Austin's posthumous How To Do Things With Words, a speech act should be analysed as a locutionary act (i.e. the actual utterance and its ostensible meaning, comprising phonetic, phatic, and rhetic acts corresponding to the verbal, syntactic, and semantic aspects of any meaningful utterance), as well as an illocutionary act (the semantic 'illocutionary force' of the utterance, thus its real, intended meaning), and in certain cases a further perlocutionary act (i.e. its actual effect, whether intended or not).

== Example ==
For example, the phrase "Don't do that!", a locutionary act with distinct phonetic, syntactic and semantic features, which corresponds to meaning, is an utterance serving as warning to the listener to not do the thing they are currently doing or about to do. Furthermore, the illocutionary act is implicitly describing what the speaker is doing even though the utterance is lacking a performative verb.
