= Geoffrey Midgley =

British philosopher (1921–1997)

Geoffrey Charles John Midgley (Ilford, Essex, 14 June 1921 – Newcastle, 16 April 1997) was a British philosopher.

== Life, education & career ==
Midgley had won a classical scholarship to Oxford, but served four years as a radar engineer in the RAF during the Second World War. After the war he completed the PPE course at New College, Oxford and studied under Isaiah Berlin and Gilbert Ryle. Since 1949 he worked at the Department of Philosophy, Newcastle University, as lecturer and senior lecturer (1949-1986), and as head of department (1982-1986). In 1950 he married a fellow philosopher, Mary Scrutton, with whom he raised three sons (Tom, David and Martin).

== Philosophy ==
Midgley, influenced by Wittgenstein and J.L. Austin, did some groundbreaking work in the fields of deontic logic, philosophy of language and speech act theory. He published two seminal papers (in 1955 and 1959) on the concept of a linguistic rule. The concept of constitutive rules finds its origin in Wittgenstein and Rawls, and has been elaborated by Midgley, Max Black, G.H. von Wright, David Shwayder and John Searle. In their treatment of the distinction between regulative rules and constitutive rules Midgley and Searle are on the same page.

Whereas regulative rules are prescriptions that regulate a pre-existing activity (whose existence is logically independent of the rules), constitutive rules constitute an activity the existence of which is logically dependent on the rules. For example: traffic rules are regulative rules that prescribe certain behaviour in order to regulate the traffic. Without these rules however, the traffic would not cease to be. In contrast: the rules of chess are constitutive rules that constitute the game. Without these rules chess would not exist, since the game is logically dependent on the rules.

== Publications ==
- Book Review: Ernst Cassirer - The Problem of Knowledge, Philosophy, Science and History since Hegel
  in: Mind 62:266 (1953)
- W. Mays & G.C.J. Midgley: Symposium - Linguistic Rules and Language Habits
  in: Proceedings of the Aristotelian Society, Supplementary Volumes - Vol. 29 (1955), p. 165-212 - Oxford University Press
- G.C.J. Midgley: Linguistic Rules
  in: Proceedings of the Aristotelian Society - New Series, Vol. 59 (1958 - 1959), p. 271-290 - Oxford University Press
- G.C.J. Midgley & G.H. von Wright: The Logical Problem of Induction
  in: Philosophical Quarterly 9 (36):279 (1959)
