= Discourse-completion task =

A Discourse-Completion Task (DCT) is a tool used in linguistics and pragmatics to elicit particular speech acts. A DCT consists of a one-sided role play containing a situational prompt which a participant will read to elicit the responses of another participant.

== Background ==
The instrument was originally developed by Shoshana Blum-Kulka for studying speech act realization comparatively between native and non-native Hebrew speakers, based on the work of E. Levenston.

DCTs are used in pragmatics research to study speech acts and find the medium between naturally occurring speech and scripted speech acts. In comparing role-plays to DCTs, role-plays are considered to elicit data more similar to naturally occurring speech acts, yet are considered harder to score, attributed to the influence of the interlocutors.

== Format ==
A discourse-completion task consists of scripted dialogue representing various scenarios, preceded by a short prompt describing the setting and situation. The prompt usually includes information on social distance between participants and pre-event background to help the participant construct the scenarios.

== The DCT in prosody research ==
The growing interest in the interfaces of prosody with other areas, notably pragmatics, has led to an interesting cross-fertilization of methods such as the Discourse Completion Task (DCT). In Vanrell, Feldhausen & Astruc (2018), the authors review previous and ongoing work in which the DCT method has been used to research (Romance) prosody. First, they introduce the design of the DCT used in pragmatics. After that, they discuss the design of the DCT used in Romance prosody and examine the strengths and weaknesses of the DCT method. Finally, they propose modifications and show how the DCT method can be further strengthened. All in all, they conclude that the DCT is an adequate method to research Romance prosody (as well as the prosody of other languages) and that future research should continue to consider how to further refine and improve this data collection instrument. [N.B.: The text given here is the modified abstract of the cited paper]

== See also ==
- Speech act
- Discourse analysis
