= Performative writing =

Performative writing is a form of post-modernist or avant-garde academic writing, often taking as its subject a work of visual art or performance art. It is heavily informed by critical theory, but arises ultimately from linguistic ideas around performative utterances. The term is often applied to a bricolage of other writing styles. It is claimed to be politically radical, because it thus 'defies' literary conventions and traditions.

== Overview ==
Performative writing is often practiced by feminist writers. A notable current writer in performative writing is the performance art theorist Peggy Phelan. She describes the form as one which....

"enacts the death of the 'we' that we think we are before we begin to write. A statement of allegiance to the radicality of unknowing who we are becoming, this writing pushes against the ideology of knowledge as a progressive movement forever approaching a completed end-point." (Mourning Sex, 1997)

Such a writing form is claimed to be, in itself, a form of performance. It is said to more accurately reflect the fleeting and ephemeral nature of a performance, and the various mechanisms of memory and referentiality that happen during and after the performance.

== Distinction ==
The term performative writing should not be confused with "writing that is performed", i.e.: plays, radio or poetry readings.

Performative writing is sometimes referred to by the alternative name of 'creative critical writing'—which is not to be confused with straightforward creative writing.

Critics of performative writing have described it, in practice, as: self-indulgent; insular; politically neutered due to its tiny elite audience and its neo-romantic individualism; obscurantist; often bearing only a loose relationship to the works of art it claims to be about; and dependent on the funding (of universities and public arts funding) of the very state that it claims to be against. Also that, when taught, it often paradoxically expects students to reveal personal truths and use experimental forms within a strict classroom regimen of grades, lesson attendance and exams. It can generally be seen to follow the pattern of much modernist writing, in that it seeks to create complex new literary approaches in order to seal off 'high art culture' from the attention of ordinary people and from a mass culture.

== See also ==
- Belles-lettres
- Performance studies
- Post-structuralism
