= Motorola DCT2000 =

The General Instrument/Motorola DCT2000 is a cable box used for watching TV by way of digital cable. These set-top boxes were popular in the late 1990s up until the mid to late 2000s, when the adoption of more sophisticated successors, namely those set-tops with the ability to record live programming began. The DCT2000 was used by Comcast, Service Electric in the United States, Shaw Cable in Canada, Tigo in El Salvador, NetUno in Venezuela and Xtrim in Ecuador. A version called the QIP2500 is used by providers such as Verizon FiOS.

== Features ==
The unit features coaxial connections for connecting it to the cable company's signal and to the user's TV or VCR. There are also composite (and, in some models, S-Video) connections for a high-quality connection to a TV or VCR. In order to provide 2-way communication (e.g. ordering PPV from the remote), the unit can feature an integrated RF return or a STARFONE option that uses the telephone landline to connect.
