= Carlo Dalla Pozza =

Italian philosopher

Carlo Dalla Pozza (October 16, 1942 in Taranto – July 18, 2014 in Lecce) was an Italian philosopher of science and logician.

== Biography ==
Carlo Dalla Pozza was born in Taranto, in the Southern region Apulia, from Luigi Dalla Pozza, an officer of the Italian Navy from Veneto region, and Cecilia Pontrelli from Apulia. During high school studies at the Liceo Scientifico Battaglini of Taranto, Giovanni De Tommaso, a tough old-style teacher of mathematics, gave him the taste for mathematical problems and for the elegance of proofs. Carlo studied literature and philology at the University of Bari, where he graduated with a dissertation on Renato Serra under the supervision of Aldo Vallone. Throughout his life Carlo manifested his love for Italian literature, in particular for the 19th-century poets Giacomo Leopardi, Giosuè Carducci (teacher of Serra) and Gabriele d'Annunzio. Among Italian classics he preferred Dante and Torquato Tasso.

After his dissertation Carlo studied Theoretical Linguistics with the Italian translator of Ryle's The Concept of Mind, Ferruccio Rossi-Landi, and later at the University of Pisa, before studying Formal Methods at the Catholic University in Milano. A turn in his intellectual career came from his participation to meetings held in Torino by Norberto Bobbio, developing new ideas on problems in the philosophy of law, especially on the work of Hans Kelsen, and on the formalization of deontic logic, working hard on the axiomatization of the principles of a theory of law for Luigi Ferraioli's Principia Juris. Carlo Dalla Pozza worked for many years as a high school teacher in the province of Taranto, while he was scientifically very active, attending conferences and giving lectures on various occasions. Only around 1990 he obtained a permanent position at the University of Salento, Lecce, first as "tecnico laureato" and then as "ricercatore". A petition signed by Italian and foreign scholars asking that he should be promoted to associate professor came too late in view of compulsory retirement policies in European academia.

Among the influences on his studies on linguistics and Semiotic Textology, Janos Petöfi asked him to work with him in Constanz, but Dalla Pozza preferred to work in Italy where he was very influential through connections with the Society of Logic and Philosophy of Science and the Society of Analytic Philosophy, and also through his lectures in logic, philosophy of science and computer science (mainly in the nineties) at the university of Verona (where he lectured continuously on Logic and Foundations of Computer Science from 1996 to 2002 and also after retirement until 2013), Padua, Bolzano, and his lectures on Deontic Logic at the University of Rome.

Besides the influences of Petöfi and Kelsen, his main philosophical ancestors are to be found in Gottlob Frege, Bertrand Russell and Rudolf Carnap, to whose works he devoted continuous thought. In 1988 he publishes a very classical contribution for a formal treatment of some argument in quantum physics (see references). A link between his interest in linguistics and his work in logic is given by the formal theory of pragmatics (speech acts), based on an original connection between classical logic (concerning the content of the assertion) and intuitionistic logic (concerning the act of assertion). The first move of the theory was published on Erkenntnis in 1995.

Presenting his theory of a formalization of pragmatics Dalla Pozza defines the Frege-Reichenbach-Stenius model for the formal treatment of assertions, showing that the main problem with their solution is that the assertion sign (introduced by Frege) can be used only with elementary assertive formulae. He then introduces a set of pragmatic connectives which allows for the construction of complex assertive formulae. The "content" of assertive formulae is given through the classical interpretation of classical truth-conditional connectives; pragmatic connectives, on the other hand, have an intuitionistic interpretation as justified or not justified. In this way the formal system may treat the justification value of an assertion, distinguishing it from the truth value of the proposition expressed by the formula. Besides explaining the irreducibility of Frege's assertion sign to classical metalogical tools, and introducing the proper foundation of a formal theory of speech acts, Dalla Pozza's theory gives also an original solution to the problem of the compatibility between classical and intuitionistic logic. The Erkenntnis paper was followed by other works on the logic of questions and answers, on deontic logic and on substructural logic (see references below). Dalla Pozza's work has raised interest in different contexts, both in philosophy and computer science (see for instance the work of Richard S. Anderson 2009, and the work of Kurt Ranalter 2008). In 2008 an issue of Fundamenta Informaticae has been devoted to his ideas in formal pragmatics.

== Legacy ==
The work by Dalla Pozza has found application in the formalization of legal systems, in the formalization of pragmatics as a theory of speech acts, on a peculiar trend in the philosophy of quantum physics (see the works of Claudio Garola) and on some developments in computer science and logic (see the works by Gianluigi Bellin on a pragmatic interpretation of bi-intuitionism and on co-intuitionistic linear logic).

== Works ==
Lists of his works can be found at Carlo Dalla Pozza's home page and on academia.edu, from which we take some basic information:

- On the logical foundations of the Jauch-Piron approach to Quantum Physics (with G. Cattaneo, C. Garola, G. Nisticò), in International Journal of Theoretical Physics, Vol. 27, n° 11, 1988
- Un’interpretazione pragmatica della logica proposizionale intuizionistica, in Usberti G. (ed.), Problemi fondazionali nella teoria del significato, Leo S. Olschki, Firenze, 1991
- Una fondazione pragmatica della logica delle domande, unpublished handwritten (draft, May 1991)
- Parlare di niente. Termini singolari non denotanti e atti illocutori, in 'Idee', anno VIII, n° 23, 1993
- A pragmatic interpretation of intuitionistic propositional logic (with C. Garola), in Erkenntnis, 43, 1995 (pp. 81–109)
- Una logica pragmatica per la concezione “espressiva” delle norme, in Martino A. (ed.), Logica delle Norme, S.E.U., Pisa, 1997
- A pragmatic interpretation of substructural logics (with G. Bellin), in W. Sieg, R. Sommer and C. Talcott (eds.), Reflections on the Foundations of Mathematics. Essays in Honor of Solomon Feferman - ASL Lectures Notes in Logic, Natick Massachusetts, 2003
- Il problema di Gettier: osservazioni su giustificazione, prova e probabilità (with D. Chiffi), talk at the SIFA conference Analytic Philosophy and European Culture, Genoa, 2004
- A pragmatic logic for the expressive conception of norms and values and The Frege-Geach problem, Editoria Scientifica Elettronica, 2008
- Come distinguere scienza e non-scienza: verificabilità, falsificabilità e confermabilità bayesiana (with A. Negro), Carocci, 2017, ISBN 978-8-843-08078-6,
