= Collapsing sequence =

A collapsing sequence occurs in human speech when utterance pairs between speakers have some unspoken thought occurring between them that may make the latter phrase, out of context, seem to have no logical connection to the former; there is, however, an implication that logical thought has occurred between the two phrases, so that the latter phrase will make sense based upon an assumption of its relation to the former.

== Examples ==
Customer: What's chocolate filbert?

Clerk: We don't have any.

The clerk's reply is in response to what he knows will come next in the discourse. If the clerk had proceeded to explain what chocolate filbert is, then it is possible that the customer would have asked for some. By explaining what the product is, the clerk would have tacitly implied that he had some to sell. Describing a product in a selling situation is often an implication that it is available. A waiter, for example, would not launch into a detailed description of a particular dish that a customer is inquiring about, only to end the discourse by then informing the customer that the dish is not available.

Another common collapsing sequence is illustrated below:

A. Do you smoke? B. I left them in my other jacket.

This type of collapsing sequence speeds up social interaction by averting unnecessary explanations.

Collapsing sequences can be used in other situations as well, such as when someone joins a discussion already in progress:

Hi, John. We were just talking about nursery schools.

In the phrasing of this response, the speaker is either warning John not join the group, or is giving him orientation so that he can understand the context of the discussion and participate.

== See also ==
- Cooperative principle
