= Performative verb =

Verbs carried out through being uttered

Performative verbs are verbs carried out simply by means of uttering them aloud. When a judge sentences someone to jail time, for example, the action is completed when they say, "I hereby sentence you to five years in prison", or the like. Compare this with the sentence "I run every day", in which the verb run merely represents the action of moving quickly.

== Other examples ==
- "We order the defendant to pay damages in the amount of $20,000."
- "I move for a mistrial."
- "I quit."
- "I resign."
- "I do." (wedding vow)

== Identification ==
One can identify a performative verb by using the hereby test. In English, only performative verbs may be preceded by hereby while other verbs in the same context are unacceptable. For example, in the sentences below, 1 and 2 differ only in the verb and both are acceptable. In the corresponding pair, 3 and 4, the use of hereby before the non-performative verb see is not coherent because the action of seeing is not performed simply by its utterance.

1. "I confer this award."
2. "I see this award."
3. "I hereby confer this award."
4. "I hereby see this award."

== See also ==
- Performative utterance
- Speech act
