= Illocutionary act =

Linguistic term coined by J. L. Austin

The concept of illocutionary acts was introduced into linguistics by the philosopher J. L. Austin in his investigation of the various aspects of speech acts. In his framework, locution is what was said, illocution is what was meant, and perlocution is the way it was received.

When somebody says "Is there any salt?" at the dinner table, the illocutionary act is a request: "please give me some salt" even though the locutionary act (the literal sentence) was to ask a question about the presence of salt. The perlocutionary act (the actual effect), might be to cause somebody to pass the salt.

== Overview ==
The notion of an illocutionary act is closely connected with Austin's doctrine of the so-called "performative" and "constative utterances": an utterance is "performative" if, and only if, it is issued in the course of the "doing of an action" (1975, 5), by which, again, Austin means the performance of an illocutionary act (Austin 1975, 6 n2, 133). According to Austin's original exposition in How to Do Things With Words, an illocutionary act is an act:

1. for the performance of which I must make it clear to some other person that the act is performed (Austin speaks of the 'securing of uptake'), and
2. the performance of which involves the production of what Austin calls 'conventional consequences' as, e.g., rights, commitments, or obligations (Austin 1975, 116f., 121, 139).

Thus, for example, in order to make a promise one must make clear to their audience that the act one is performing is the making of a promise, and in the performance of the act one will be undertaking a conventional obligation to do the promised thing: the promisee will understand what it means to make a promise and fulfill it. Thus, promising is an illocutionary act in the present sense. Since Austin's death, the term has been defined differently by various authors.

One way to think about the difference between an illocutionary act (e.g., a declaration, command, or a promise), and a perlocutionary act (e.g., a listener's reaction) is to note how in the former case, by uttering the object – for example, "I hereby promise you" – (and assuming that all other necessary features of the performative situation pertain), then the act has taken place: a promise was made. The perlocutionary result (how the promisee reacts) might be acceptance, or skepticism, or disbelief, but none of these reactions alter the illocutionary force of the statement: the promise was made.

That is to say, in each case a declaration, command, or promise has necessarily taken place in virtue of the utterance itself, whether the hearer believes in or acts upon the declaration, command, or promise or not.

On the other hand, with a perlocutionary act, the object of the utterance has not taken place unless the hearer deems it so — for example, if one utters, "I hereby insult you," or "I hereby persuade you" — one would not assume an insult has necessarily occurred, nor persuasion has necessarily taken place, unless the hearer were suitably offended or persuaded by the utterance.

== Approaches to defining illocutionary act ==
Whereas Austin used performative to talk about certain kinds of utterances as having "force," his term illocution rather names a quality or aspect of all utterances. They will have a locutionary sense or meaning, an illocutionary force, and a perlocutionary result. This approach has encouraged the view that even true/false constative statements have illocutionary force (as in "I hereby state and affirm") and even performatives can be evaluable as true–false statements (as "guilty" verdict might be right or wrong).

It is also often emphasised that Austin introduced the illocutionary act by means of a contrast with other aspects of "doing" by "speaking." The illocutionary act, he says, is an act performed in saying something, as contrasted with a locutionary act, the act of saying something, and also contrasted with a perlocutionary act, an act performed by saying something. Austin, however, eventually abandoned the "in saying" / "by saying" test (1975, 123).

According to the conception adopted by Bach and Harnish in "Linguistic Communication and Speech Acts" (1979), an illocutionary act is an attempt to communicate, which they analyse as the expression of an attitude. Another conception of the illocutionary act goes back to Schiffer's book Meaning (1972, 103), in which the illocutionary act is represented as just the act of meaning something.

According to a widespread opinion, an adequate and useful account of "illocutionary acts" has been provided by John Searle (e.g., 1969, 1975, 1979). In recent years, however, it has been doubted whether Searle's account is well-founded. A wide-ranging critique is in FC Doerge 2006. Collections of articles examining Searle's account are: Burkhardt 1990 and Lepore / van Gulick 1991.

== Classes of illocutionary acts ==
Searle (1975) set up the following classification of illocutionary speech acts:

- assertives = speech acts that commit a speaker to the truth of the expressed proposition
- directives = speech acts that are to cause the hearer to take a particular action, e.g. requests, commands and advice
- commissives = speech acts that commit a speaker to some future action, e.g. promises and oaths
- expressives = speech acts that express on the speaker's attitudes and emotions towards the proposition, e.g. congratulations, excuses and thanks
- declarations = speech acts that change the reality in accord with the proposition of the declaration, e.g. baptisms, pronouncing someone guilty or pronouncing someone husband and wife

The classification is intended to be exhaustive but the classes are not mutually exclusive: John Austin's well-known example "I bet you five pounds it will rain" is both directive and commissive.

== Illocutionary force ==
Several speech act theorists, including Austin himself, make use of the notion of an illocutionary force. In Austin's original account, the notion remains rather unclear. Some followers of Austin, such as David Holdcroft, view illocutionary force as the property of an utterance to be made with the intention to perform a certain illocutionary act—rather than as the successful performance of the act (which is supposed to further require the appropriateness of certain circumstances). According to this conception, the utterance of "I bet you five pounds that it will rain" may well have an illocutionary force even if the addressee does not hear it. However, Bach and Harnish assume illocutionary force if, and only if this or that illocutionary act is actually (successfully) performed. According to this conception, the addressee must have heard and understood that the speaker intends to make a bet with them in order for the utterance to have illocutionary force.

If the notion of illocutionary force is adopted as an aspect of meaning, then it appears that the (intended) force of certain sentences, or utterances, is not quite obvious. If someone says, "It sure is cold in here", there are several different illocutionary acts that might be aimed at by the utterance. The utterer might intend to describe the room, in which case the illocutionary force would be that of describing. But she might also intend to criticise someone who should have kept the room warm. Or it might be meant as a request to someone to close the window. These forces may be interrelated: it may be by way of stating that the temperature is too cold that one criticises someone else. Such a performance of an illocutionary act by means of the performance of another is referred to as an indirect speech act.

== Illocutionary force indicating devices (IFIDs) ==
Searle and Vanderveken (1985) often speak about what they call 'illocutionary force indicating devices' (IFIDs). These are supposed to be elements, or aspects of linguistic devices which indicate either (dependent on which conceptions of "illocutionary force" and "illocutionary act" are adopted) that the utterance is made with a certain illocutionary force, or else that it constitutes the performance of a certain illocutionary act. In English, for example, the interrogative is supposed to indicate that the utterance is (intended as) a question; the directive indicates that the utterance is (intended as) a directive illocutionary act (an order, a request, etc.); the words "I promise" are supposed to indicate that the utterance is (intended as) a promise. Possible IFIDs in English include: word order, stress, intonation contour, punctuation, the mood of the verb, and performative verbs.

== Illocutionary negations ==
Another notion Searle and Vanderveken use is that of an 'illocutionary negation'. The difference of such an 'illocutionary negation' to a 'propositional negation' can be explained by reference to the difference between "I do not promise to come" and "I promise not to come". The first is an illocutionary negation—the 'not' negates the promise. The second is a propositional negation. In the view of Searle and Vanderveken, illocutionary negations change the type of illocutionary act.

== See also ==
- Direction of fit
- J. L. Austin
- John Searle
- Linguistics
- Performative utterance
- Perlocutionary act
- Pragmatics
- Searle–Derrida debate
- Semantics
- Speech act
