= Performative utterance =

Category of utterances in philosophy of language

In the philosophy of language and speech acts theory, performative utterances are sentences which not only describe a given reality, but also change the social reality they are describing.

In a 1955 lecture series, later published as How to Do Things with Words, J. L. Austin argued against a positivist philosophical claim that the utterances always "describe" or "constate" something and are thus always true or false. After mentioning several examples of sentences which are not so used, and not truth-evaluable (among them nonsensical sentences, interrogatives, directives and "ethical" propositions), he introduces "performative" sentences or illocutionary act as another instance.

In 1971, it was referred to by Johnathan Miller in his discussion on UK immigration with Enoch Powell on the Dick Cavett show.

== Austin's definition ==
In order to define performatives, Austin refers to those sentences which conform to the old standards in that they are used to describe or constate something, and which thus are true or false; and he calls such sentences "constatives". In contrast to them, Austin defines "performatives" as follows:

- Performative utterances are not true or false, that is, not truth-evaluable; instead when something is wrong with them then they are "unhappy", while if nothing is wrong they are "happy".
- The uttering of a performative is, or is part of, the doing of a certain kind of action (Austin later deals with them under the name illocutionary acts), the performance of which, again, would not normally be described as simply "saying" or "describing" something (cf. Austin 1962, 5).

The initial examples of performative sentences Austin gives are these:

- "I do (sc. take this woman to be my lawful wedded wife)" – as uttered in the course of a marriage ceremony.
- "I name this ship the Queen Elizabeth"
- "I give and bequeath my watch to my brother" – as occurring in a will
- "I bet you sixpence it will rain tomorrow" (Austin 1962, 5)

As Austin later notices himself, these examples belong (more or less strikingly) to what Austin calls, explicit performatives; to utter an "explicit" performative sentence is to make explicit what act one is performing. However, there are also "implicit", "primitive", or "inexplicit" performatives. When, for instance, one uses the word "Go!" in order to command someone to leave the room then this utterance is part of the performance of a command; and the sentence, according to Austin, is neither true nor false; hence the sentence is a performative; – still, it is not an explicit performative, for it does not make explicit that the act the speaker is performing is a command.

As Austin observes, the acts purported to be performed by performative utterances may be socially contested. For instance, "I divorce you", said three times by a man to his wife, may be accepted to constitute a divorce by some, but not by others.

Every performative utterance has its own procedure and risks of failure that Austin calls 'infelicities'. He sees a sharp distinction between the individual text and the 'total speech act situation' surrounding it. According to Austin, in order to successfully perform an illocutionary act, certain conditions have to be met (e.g. a person who pronounces a marriage must be authorized to do so). Besides the context, the performative utterance itself is unambiguous as well. The words of an illocutionary act have to be expressed in earnest; if not, Austin discards them as a parasitic use of language.

== John Searle ==
Building on Austin's thought, language philosopher John Searle tried to develop his own account of speech acts, suggesting that these acts are a form of rule-governed behaviour. On the one hand, Searle discerns rules that merely regulate language, such as referring and predicating. These rules account for the "propositional content" of sentences. On the other hand, he discerns rules that are constitutive in character and define behaviour (e.g. when making a promise). These rules are the conventions underlying performative utterances and they enable not only representation and expression, but also communication.

This focus on effect implies a conscious actor and Searle assumes that language stems from an intrinsic intentionality of the mind. These intentions set the prerequisites for the performance of speech acts and Searle sets out to map their necessary and sufficient conditions.

Searle argued in his 1989 article How Performatives Work that performatives are true or false just like constatives. Searle further claimed that performatives are what he calls declarations; this is a technical notion of Searle's account: according to his conception, an utterance is a declaration, if "the successful performance of the speech act is sufficient to bring about the fit between words and world, to make the propositional content true." Searle believes that this double direction of fit contrasts the simple word-to-world fit of assertives.

== Performative text ==
Building on the notion of performative utterances, scholars have theorized on the relation of a spoken or written text to its broader context, that is to say everything outside the text itself. The question whether a performative is separable from the situation it emerged in is relevant when one addresses for example the status of individual intentions or speech as a resource of power. There are two main theoretical strands in research today. One emphasizes the predetermined conventions surrounding a performative utterance and the clear distinction between text and context. Another emphasizes the active construction of reality through spoken and written texts and is related to theories of human agency and discourse. The ideas about performance and text have contributed to the performative turn in the social sciences and humanities, proving their methodological use for example in the interpretation of historical texts.

Early theories acknowledge that performance and text are both embedded in a system of rules and that the effects they can produce depend on convention and recurrence. In this sense, text is an instance of 'restored behaviour', a term introduced by Richard Schechner that sees performance as a repeatable ritual. The focus here is largely on individual sentences in the active first person voice, rather than on politics or discourse. The syntactical analyses are firmly anchored in analytical epistemology, as the distinction between the research object and its context is not conceived as problematic.

=== Postmodernist theories ===
The second set of theories on performance and text diverged from the tradition represented by Austin and Searle. Bearing the stamp of postmodernism, it states that neither the meaning, nor the context of a text can be defined in its entirety. Instead of emphasizing linguistic rules, scholars within this strand stress that the performative utterance is intertwined with structures of power. Because a text inevitably changes a situation or discourse, the distinction between text and context is blurred.

Austin and Searle thought in terms of demarcated contexts and transparent intentions, two issues that in the 1970s led Searle into polemics with postmodern thinker Jacques Derrida. (Note: In 1972 Jacques Derrida published the article 'Signature Événement Contexte', in which he criticises several aspects of Austin's theory on the performative utterance. The first English translation appeared in 1977 in the first volume of Glyph. In the second volume (1977) Searle published an article called: 'Reiterating the differences: a reply to Derrida', in which he defended Austin's theories. Derrida responded with the essay 'Limited Inc a b c...', (1977).)

The postmodern philosopher Jacques Derrida holds with Austin and Searle that by illocutionary force, language itself can transform and effect. However, he criticizes the notion of 'felicity conditions' and the idea that the success of a performative utterance is determined by conventions. Derrida values the distinctiveness of every individual speech act, because it has a specific effect in the particular situation in which it is performed. It is because of this effect or 'breaking force' that Derrida calls the possibility of repeating a text 'iterability', a word derived from Latin iterare, to repeat.

According to Derrida, the effects caused by a performative text are in a sense also part of it. In this way, the distinction between a text and that which is outside it dissolves. For this reason it is pointless to try to define the context of a speech act.

Besides the consequential effects, the dissolution of the text-context divide is also caused by iterability. Due to the possibility of repetition, the intentions of an individual actor can never be fully present in a speech act. The core of a performative utterance is therefore not constituted by animating intentions, as Austin and Searle would have it, but by the structure of language.

The philosopher Judith Butler offers a political interpretation of the concept of the performative utterance. Power in the form of active censorship defines and regulates the domain of a certain discourse. Indebted to the work of Michel Foucault, Butler expounds how subjects are produced by their context, because the possibilities of speech are predetermined.

Notwithstanding such social restraints, Butler underscores the possibility of agency. The boundaries of a discourse need continuous re-demarcation and this is where speech can escape its constriction. The emphasis on the limits of what is allowed to be said also frames that what is silenced. Performativity has a political aspect that consists in what Derrida has described as the breaking force, by which an utterance changes its context. Butler assigns an important role to what Austin has called infelicities and parasitic uses of language. Quotations, parodies and other deviations from official discourse can become instruments of power that affect society.

In A Thousand Plateaus, Deleuze and Guattari define language as the totality of all performative utterances, which they call order-words. They write "We call order-words, not a particular category of explicit statements (for example, in the imperative), but the relation of every word or every statement to implicit presuppositions, in other words, to speech acts that are, and can only be, accomplished in the statement. Order-words do not concern commands only, but every act that is linked to statements by a "social obligation." Every statement displays this link, directly or indirectly. Questions, promises, are order-words. The only possible definition of language is the set of all order-words."

=== Historical methodology ===
The historian Quentin Skinner developed classical and postmodern theories on performative texts into a concrete research method. Using Austin's vocabulary, he seeks to recover what historical authors were doing in writing their texts, which corresponds with the performance of illocutionary acts. According to Skinner, philosophical ideas are intertwined with claims of power. Every text is an act of communication that positions itself in relation to the status quo it seeks to change.

Skinner agrees with Derrida that contexts in their entirety are irretrievable but nevertheless states that there is a relevant context outside the text that can be described in a plausible way. Extensive research is required to relate historical texts to their contemporary discourses. According to Skinner 'there is a sense in which we need to understand why a certain proposition has been put forward if we wish to understand the proposition itself'. He values agency over structure and stresses the importance of authorial intentions. Skinner therefore proposes to study historical sources in order to retrieve the convictions the author held, reflect on their coherence and investigate possible motives for the illocutionary act. This practical method seeks to deal with the blurred distinction between text and context and offer a meaningful way of interpreting historical reality.

== The receiving side ==
Kent Bach and Robert Harnish claimed that performatives are successful only if recipients infer the intention behind the literal meaning, and that therefore the success of the performative act is determined by the receiving side.

== Performativeness as non-dichotomous variable ==
Eve Sedgwick argued that there are performative aspects to nearly all words, sentences, and phrases. Additionally, according to Sedgwick, performative utterances can be 'transformative' performatives, which create an instant change of personal or environmental status, or 'promisory' performatives, which describe the world as it might be in the future. These categories are not exclusive, so an utterance may well have both qualities. As Sedgwick observes, performative utterances can be revoked, either by the person who uttered them ("I take back my promise"), or by some other party not immediately involved, like the state (for example, gay marriage vows pre-legalisation).

== Performative writing ==
The above ideas have influenced performative writing; they are used as a justification for an attempt to create a new form of critical writing about performance (often about performance art). Such a writing form is claimed to be, in itself, a form of performance. It is said to more accurately reflect the fleeting and ephemeral nature of a performance, and the various tricks of memory and referentiality that happen in the mind of the viewer during and after the performance.

== See also ==
- Eve Sedgwick
- Illocutionary force
- J. L. Austin
- John Searle
- Judith Butler
- Performative turn
- Pragmatics
- Performativity
