= John Searle =

American philosopher (1932–2025)

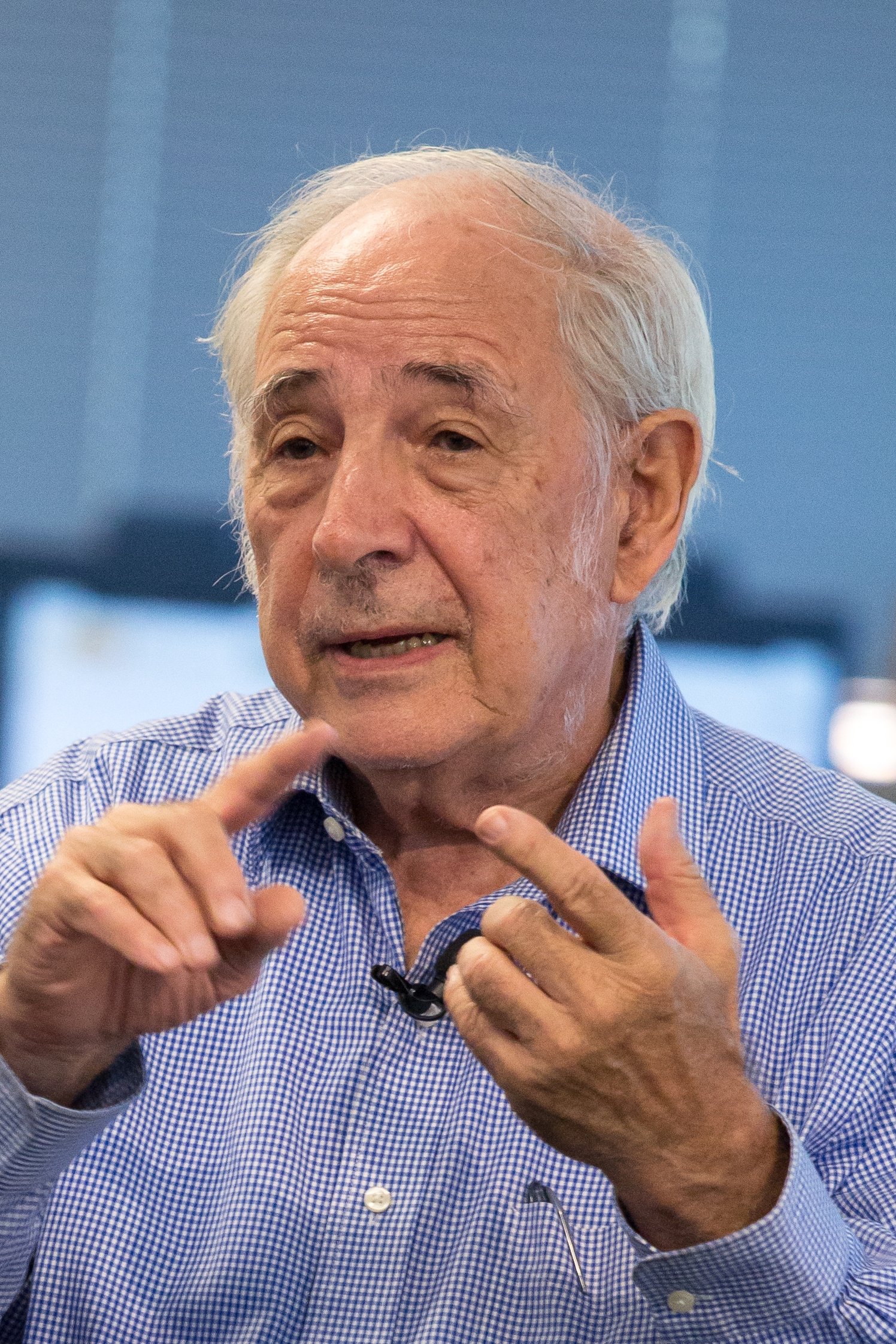
- Searle in 2015
- Born: John Rogers Searle; July 31, 1932; Denver, Colorado, U.S.
- Died: September 17, 2025 (aged 93); Safety Harbor, Florida, U.S.
- Spouse: Dagmar Carboch (m. 1958; died 2017)
- Children: 2

Education
- Education: University of Wisconsin–Madison; Christ Church, Oxford
- Thesis: Problems arising in the theory of meaning out of the notions of sense and reference (1959)
- Doctoral advisor: J. L. Austin; Peter Strawson

Philosophical work
- Era: Contemporary philosophy
- Region: Western philosophy
- School: Analytic; Direct realism
- Institutions: Christ Church, Oxford; UC Berkeley
- Doctoral students: Bence Nanay
- Notable students: William Hirstein
- Main interests: Philosophy of language; Philosophy of mind; Intentionality · Social ontology · Social reality
- Notable ideas: Indirect speech acts Chinese room Biological naturalism Direction of fit

Signature
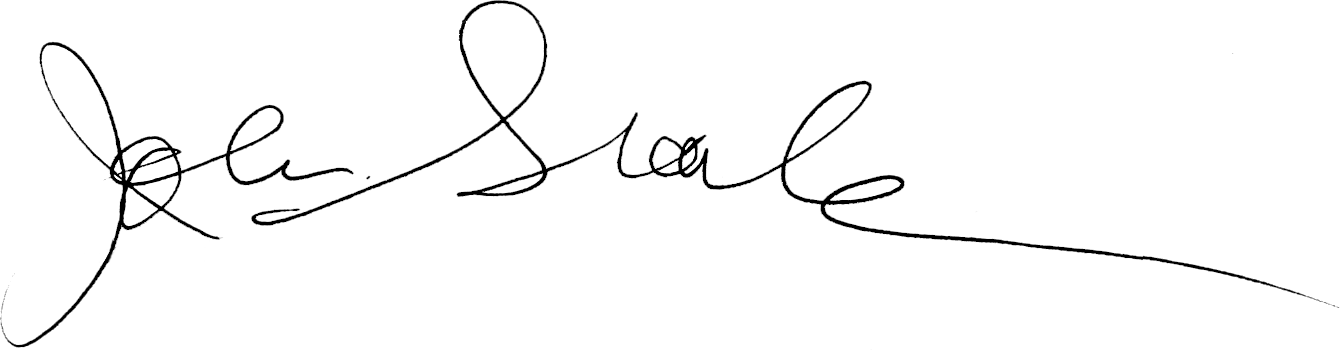

John Rogers Searle (/sɜːrl/; July 31, 1932 – September 17, 2025) was an American philosopher widely noted for contributions to the philosophy of language, philosophy of mind, and social philosophy. He was the Willis S. and Marion Slusser Professor of the Philosophy of Mind and Language at the University of California, Berkeley, until 2019. He was relieved of his position after disciplinary proceedings found he had violated the university's sexual harassment policies.

Searle's early work on speech acts, influenced by J. L. Austin and Ludwig Wittgenstein, helped establish his reputation. His most famous philosophical contribution is the "Chinese room" argument, which attempts to refute the possibility of "strong" artificial intelligence.

== Life ==
Searle was born in Denver on July 31, 1932. His father, G. W. Searle, an electrical engineer, was employed by AT&T Corporation; his mother, Hester Beck Searle, was a physician.

Searle began his college education at the University of Wisconsin–Madison. In his junior year, he became a Rhodes Scholar at the University of Oxford, from which he received all his university degrees (BA, MA, and DPhil), and where he held his first faculty positions.

Searle began teaching at the University of California, Berkeley, in 1959 and remained a faculty member there for the rest of his career. He married Dagmar Carboch, a fellow philosopher, in 1958, and had two sons. She worked as a lawyer and edited much of her husband's writing. Carboch died in 2017.

Searle received five honorary doctoral degrees from four countries and was an honorary visiting professor at Tsinghua University and East China Normal University. In 2000, he received the Jean Nicod Prize; in 2004, the National Humanities Medal; and in 2006, the Mind & Brain Prize. In 2010 he was elected to the American Philosophical Society.

At the time of his retirement in 2014, Searle was Willis S. and Marion Slusser Professor Emeritus of the Philosophy of Mind and Language and Professor of the Graduate School at the University of California, Berkeley. He continued teaching until 2016. In June 2019, his emeritus status was revoked after he was found to have engaged in sexual harassment and retaliation against a former student and employee, in violation of the university's policies.

Searle enjoyed skiing, sailing, and wine tasting, and owned a vineyard in Napa Valley, California. He died at a hospital in Safety Harbor, Florida, on September 17, 2025, at the age of 93.

=== Political activity ===
While an undergraduate at the University of Wisconsin, Searle became the secretary of "Students against Joseph McCarthy". McCarthy was the junior senator from Wisconsin at the time. At UC Berkeley, Searle was the first tenured professor to join the 1964–65 Free Speech Movement.

In 1969, while serving as chairman of the Academic Freedom Committee of the Academic Senate of the University of California, he supported the university in its dispute with students over the People's Park. In The Campus War: A Sympathetic Look at the University in Agony (1971), Searle investigated the causes behind the campus protests of the era. "I have been attacked by both the House Un-American Activities Committee and ... by several radical polemicists.... Stylistically, the attacks are interestingly similar. Both rely heavily on insinuation and innuendo, and both display a hatred—one might almost say terror—of close analysis and dissection of argument."

In the late 1980s, Searle and other landlords petitioned Berkeley's rental board to raise the limits on how much they could charge tenants under the city's 1980 rent-stabilization ordinance. After the rental board refused to consider their petition, the group sued, charging a violation of due process. In 1990, the California Supreme Court upheld Searle's argument in part and Berkeley changed its rent-control policy, leading to large increases in rent between 1991 and 1994. Searle saw the issue as one of fundamental rights, writing, "The treatment of landlords in Berkeley is comparable to the treatment of blacks in the South... our rights have been massively violated and we are here to correct that injustice." The court called the debate a "morass of political invective, ad hominem attack, and policy argument".

Shortly after the September 11 attacks, Searle wrote an op-ed arguing that the attacks were a particular event in a long-term struggle against forces intractably opposed to the United States and signaling support for a more aggressive neoconservative interventionist foreign policy. He argued that the US was in a more-or-less permanent state of war with these forces and should deny terrorists the use of foreign territory from which to stage attacks. He blamed the attacks on the lack of American resolve to deal forcefully with its enemies over the previous decades.

=== Sexual assault allegations ===
In March 2017, Searle became the subject of sexual assault allegations. The Los Angeles Times reported: "A new lawsuit alleges that university officials failed to properly respond to complaints that John Searle ... sexually assaulted his ... research associate last July and cut her pay when she rejected his advances." The case brought to light several earlier complaints against Searle on which Berkeley had allegedly failed to act.

The lawsuit, filed in a California court on March 21, 2017, alleged sexual harassment, retaliation, wrongful dismissal, assault, and battery, and sought damages both from Searle and the Regents of the University of California. It also claimed that Jennifer Hudin, the director of the John Searle Center for Social Ontology, where the complainant had been employed as Searle's assistant, said Searle "has had sexual relationships with his students and others in the past in exchange for academic, monetary or other benefits". After the lawsuit became public, several previous allegations of sexual harassment and assault by Searle were revealed.

On June 19, 2019, following campus disciplinary proceedings by Berkeley's Office for the Prevention of Harassment and Discrimination, University of California President Janet Napolitano approved a recommendation that Searle have his emeritus status revoked, after a determination that he had violated university policies against sexual harassment and retaliation between July and September 2016.

== Philosophical work ==
=== Speech acts ===
Searle's early work, which did much to establish his reputation, was on speech acts. He attempted to synthesize ideas from many colleagues—including J. L. Austin (the "illocutionary act", from How To Do Things with Words), Ludwig Wittgenstein, and G. C. J. Midgley (the distinction between regulative and constitutive rules)—with his own thesis that such acts are constituted by the rules of language. He also drew on the work of Paul Grice (the analysis of meaning as an attempt at being understood), R. M. Hare, and Stenius (the distinction, concerning meaning, between illocutionary force and propositional content), P. F. Strawson, John Rawls, and William Alston, who maintained that sentence meaning consists in sets of regulative rules requiring the speaker to perform the illocutionary act indicated by the sentence and that such acts involve the utterance of a sentence that (a) indicates that one performs the act; (b) means what one says; and (c) addresses an audience in the vicinity.

In his 1969 book Speech Acts, Searle sets out to combine all these elements to give his account of illocutionary acts. He gives an analysis of what he considers the prototypical illocutionary act of promising and offers sets of semantical rules intended to represent the linguistic meaning of devices indicating further illocutionary act types. Among concepts presented in the book is the distinction between the "illocutionary force" and the "propositional content" of an utterance. Searle does not define the former but introduces several possible illocutionary forces by example. According to Searle, the sentences

1. Sam smokes habitually.
2. Does Sam smoke habitually?
3. Sam, smoke habitually!
4. Would that Sam smoked habitually!

all have the same propositional content (Sam smoking habitually) but differ in illocutionary force (respectively, a statement, a question, a command, and an expression of desire).

According to a later account, which Searle presents in Intentionality (1983) and which differs in important ways from the one suggested in Speech Acts, illocutionary acts are characterized by having "conditions of satisfaction", an idea adopted from Strawson's 1971 paper "Meaning and Truth", and a "direction of fit", an idea adopted from Austin and Elizabeth Anscombe. For example, the statement "John bought two candy bars" is satisfied if and only if it is true, i.e., if John bought two candy bars. By contrast, the command "John, buy two candy bars!" is satisfied if and only if it causes John to buy two candy bars. Searle refers to the first as having the "word-to-world" direction of fit, since the words are supposed to change to accurately represent the world, and the second as having the "world-to-word" direction of fit, since the world is supposed to change to match the words. There is also double direction of fit, in which the relationship goes both ways, and null or zero direction of fit, in which it goes neither way because the propositional content is presupposed, as in "I am sorry I ate John's candy bars."

In Foundations of Illocutionary Logic (1985, with Daniel Vanderveken), Searle prominently uses the notion of the "illocutionary point".

Several thinkers have challenged Searle's speech-act theory in various ways. Collections of articles referring to Searle's account are found in Burkhardt 1990 and Lepore / van Gulick 1991.

=== Intentionality and the background ===
In Intentionality: An Essay in the Philosophy of Mind (1983), Searle applies the principles of his account(s) of illocutionary acts to the investigation of intentionality, which is central to Searle's philosophy of mind. (He emphasizes that "intentionality", the capacity of mental states to be about worldly objects, is not to be confused with "intensionality", the referential opacity of contexts that fail tests for "extensionality".)

For Searle, intentionality is exclusively mental, being the power of minds to represent or symbolize things, properties, and states of affairs in the external world. Causal covariance, about-ness and the like are not enough: maps, for instance, have only "derived" intentionality, a mere after-image of the real thing.

Searle also introduces a technical term, Background, which, according to him, has been the source of much philosophical discussion ("though I have been arguing for this thesis for almost twenty years," Searle writes, "many people whose opinions I respect still disagree with me about it"). He calls Background the set of abilities, capacities, tendencies, and dispositions humans have that are not themselves intentional states but that generate appropriate such states on demand.

Thus, when someone is asked to "cut the cake", they know to use a knife, and when someone is asked to "cut the grass", they know to use a mower (and not vice versa), even though the request does not mention that. Beginning with the possibility of reversing these two, an endless series of skeptical, anti-real or science-fiction interpretations could be imagined. "I wish to say that there is a radical underdetermination of what is said by the literal meaning", Searle writes. The Background fills the gap, being the capacity always to have a suitable interpretation at hand. "I just take a huge metaphysics for granted", he writes. Searle sometimes supplements his reference to the Background with the concept of the Network, one's network of other beliefs, desires, and other intentional states necessary for any particular intentional state to make sense.

For example, two chess players might be engaged in a bitter struggle but share all sorts of Background presuppositions: that they will take turns to move, that no one else will intervene, that they are playing by the same rules, that the fire alarm will not go off, that the board will not suddenly disintegrate, that neither of them will magically turn into a grapefruit, and so on indefinitely. As most of these possibilities will not have occurred to either player, Searle thinks the Background is itself unconscious as well as nonintentional. To have a Background is to have a set of brain structures that generate appropriate intentional states (if the fire alarm does go off, say). "Those brain structures enable me to activate the system of intentionality and to make it function, but the capacities realized in the brain structures do not themselves consist in intentional states."

It seems to Searle that David Hume and Friedrich Nietzsche were probably the first philosophers to appreciate, respectively, the centrality and radical contingency of the Background. "Nietzsche saw, with anxiety, that the Background does not have to be the way it is." Searle also says a Background appears in other modern thinkers' ideas: as the river-bed/substratum of Wittgenstein's On Certainty ("the work of the later Wittgenstein is in large part about the Background, especially On Certainty") and Pierre Bourdieu's habitus.

In his debate with Jacques Derrida, Searle argued against Derrida's purported view that a statement can be disjoined from its author's original intentionality, for example when no longer connected to the author, while still producing meaning. Searle maintained that even if one read a written statement with no knowledge of its authorship it would still be impossible to escape the question of intentionality, because "a meaningful sentence is just a standing possibility of the (intentional) speech act". For Searle, ascribing intentionality to a statement was required for attributing any meaning to it.

In 2023 Pierre Jacob called Searle's view "anti-intentionalist".

=== Consciousness ===
Building on his views about intentionality, Searle presented a view of consciousness in his book The Rediscovery of the Mind (1992). He argues that, starting with behaviorism, an early but influential scientific view, succeeded by many later accounts that Searle also dismisses, much of modern philosophy has tried to deny the existence of consciousness, with little success. In Intentionality, he parodies several alternative theories of consciousness by replacing their accounts of intentionality with comparable accounts of the hand:

No one would think of saying, for example, "Having a hand is just being disposed to certain sorts of behavior such as grasping" (manual behaviorism), or "Hands can be defined entirely in terms of their causes and effects" (manual functionalism), or "For a system to have a hand is just for it to be in a certain computer state with the right sorts of inputs and outputs" (manual Turing machine functionalism), or "Saying that a system has hands is just adopting a certain stance toward it" (the "manual stance").

Searle argues that philosophy has been trapped by a false dichotomy: that, on the one hand, the world consists of nothing but objective particles in fields of force, but that, on the other hand, consciousness is clearly a subjective first-person experience. Searle says both are true: consciousness is a real subjective experience, caused by the physical processes of the brain. This is an aspect of his theory of biological naturalism.

==== Ontological subjectivity ====
Searle argues that critics like Daniel Dennett, who he claims insist that discussing subjectivity is unscientific because science presupposes objectivity, are making a category error. Perhaps the goal of science is to establish and validate epistemically objective statements, i.e., those whose truth can be discovered and evaluated by any interested party, but not necessarily ontologically objective ones.

Searle calls any value judgment epistemically subjective. Thus, "McKinley is prettier than Everest" is "epistemically subjective", whereas "McKinley is higher than Everest" is "epistemically objective". In other words, the latter statement is evaluable, in fact, falsifiable, by an understood ("background") criterion for mountain height, such as "the summit is so many meters above sea level". No such criteria exist for prettiness.

Beyond this distinction, Searle thinks there are certain phenomena, including all conscious experiences, that are ontologically subjective, i.e., that exist only as subjective experience. For example, although it might be subjective or objective in the epistemic sense, a doctor's note that a patient suffers from back pain is an epistemically objective claim: it counts as a medical diagnosis only because the existence of back pain is "an objective fact of medical science". But the pain itself is ontologically subjective: it is experienced only by the person having it.

Searle asserts that "where consciousness is concerned, the existence of the appearance is the reality". His view that the epistemic and ontological senses of objective/subjective are cleanly separable is crucial to his self-proclaimed biological naturalism, because it allows epistemically objective judgments like "That object is a pocket calculator" to pick out agent-relative features of objects, and such features are, on his terms, ontologically subjective, unlike, say, "That object is made mostly of plastic."

==== Artificial intelligence ====
Biological naturalism implies that creating a conscious being requires replicating the physical processes through which the brain gives rise to consciousness. Searle thereby means to contradict what he calls "Strong AI", defined by the assumption that "the appropriately programmed computer really is a mind, in the sense that computers given the right programs can be literally said to understand and have other cognitive states."

In 1980, Searle presented the "Chinese room" argument, which purports to show the impossibility of strong AI. A person is in a room with two slots, and they have a book and some scratch paper. This person does not know any Chinese. Someone outside the room slides some Chinese characters in through the first slot; the person in the room follows the instructions in the book, transcribing the characters as instructed onto the scratch paper, and slides the result out the second slot. To people outside the room, it appears that the room speaks Chinese: Chinese statements go into one slot and valid responses in English come out the second – yet the "room" does not understand a word of Chinese. According to Searle, this suggests that no computer can understand Chinese or English, because "translating" Chinese into English does not entail "understanding" either: all that the person in the Chinese room, and hence a computer, can do is execute certain symbolic manipulations. In their book The Mind's I, Douglas Hofstadter and Daniel Dennett criticize the Chinese room argument.

Stevan Harnad argues that Searle's "Strong AI" is really just another name for functionalism and computationalism, and that these positions are his critique's real targets. Functionalists argue that consciousness can be defined as a set of informational processes inside the brain. It follows that anything that carries out those processes is conscious. Thus, if a computer program is conscious, that program could run on, say, a system of ping-pong balls and beer cups and still be conscious, because it is running the same processes.

Searle argues that this is impossible, contending that consciousness is a physical property, like digestion or fire. No matter how good a simulation of digestion is built on the computer, it will not digest anything; no matter how well it simulates fire, nothing will be burned. By contrast, informational processes are observer-relative: observers pick out certain patterns in the world and consider them information processes, but information processes are not things-in-the-world themselves. Since they do not exist at a physical level, Searle argues, they cannot have causal efficacy and thus cannot cause consciousness.

=== Social reality ===
Searle extended his inquiries into observer-relative phenomena by trying to understand social reality. He begins by arguing that collective intentionality (e.g., "we are going for a walk") is a distinct form of intentionality, not reducible to individual intentionality (e.g., "I am going for a walk with him and I think he thinks he is going for a walk with me and he thinks I think I am going for a walk with him and...")

In The Construction of Social Reality (1995), Searle addresses the mystery of how social constructs like "baseball" or "money" can exist in a world consisting only of physical particles in fields of force. Adapting an idea from G. E. M. Anscombe's "On Brute Facts", Searle distinguishes between brute facts, like the height of a mountain, and institutional facts, like the score of a baseball game. Aiming at an explanation of social phenomena in terms of Anscombe's notion, he argues that society can be explained in terms of institutional facts, and institutional facts arise out of collective intentionality through constitutive rules with the logical form "X counts as Y in C". Thus, for instance, filling out a ballot counts as a vote in a polling place, getting so many votes counts as winning an election, winning a certain election counts as being elected president, etc.

Many sociologists see Searle's contributions to social theory as insignificant. Neil Gross, for example, argues that Searle's views on society are more or less a reconstitution of the sociologist Émile Durkheim's theories of social facts, social institutions, collective representations, and the like, and are thus vulnerable to the same criticisms as Durkheim's. Searle responded that Durkheim's work was worse than he had originally believed and, admitting he had not read much of it, said: "Because Durkheim's account seemed so impoverished I did not read any further in his work." In response to Searle's response to Gross, Steven Lukes disputed Searle's allegations against Durkheim, affirming Gross's argument that Searle's work strongly resembles Durkheim's. Lukes attributes Searle's misunderstanding of Durkheim's work to his not having read Durkheim.

==== Searle–Lawson debate ====
Searle's main interlocutor on issues of social ontology was Tony Lawson. Their accounts of social reality are similar, but have important differences. Lawson emphasizes the notion of social totality whereas Searle prefers to refer to institutional facts. Furthermore, Searle believes that emergence implies causal reduction whereas Lawson argues that social totalities cannot be completely explained by the causal powers of their components. Searle also places language at the foundation of the construction of social reality, while Lawson believes that community formation necessarily precedes the development of language and, therefore, that non-linguistic social structure formation must be possible.

=== Rationality ===
In Rationality in Action (2001), Searle argues that standard notions of rationality are badly flawed. According to what he calls the Classical Model, rationality is seen as something like a train track: a person moves onto it at one point with their beliefs and desires, and then the rules of rationality compel them to a conclusion. Searle doubts that this picture of rationality holds generally.

Searle briefly critiques one particular set of these rules: those of mathematical decision theory. He points out that its axioms require that anyone who valued a quarter and their life would, at some odds, bet their life for a quarter. Searle insists he would never take such a bet and believes this stance is perfectly rational.

Most of his attack is against the common conception of rationality, which he believes is badly flawed. First, he argues that reason does not cause anyone to do anything, because having sufficient reason wills, but does not force, a person to do something. Therefore, in any decision situation, people experience a gap between reasons and actions. For example, when a person decides to vote, they may determine that they care most about economic policy and that they prefer candidate Jones's economic policy, but they must also make an effort to cast a vote. Similarly, every time a smoker who feels guilty about their action lights a cigarette, they are aware that they are succumbing to their craving, and not merely acting automatically as they do when they exhale. This gap makes people think they have freedom of the will. Searle thinks that whether one really has free will is an open question, but considers its absence highly unappealing because it makes the feeling of free will an epiphenomenon, which is highly unlikely from an evolutionary point of view given its biological cost. He writes, "All rational activity presupposes free will".

Second, Searle believes that people can rationally do things that do not result from their desires. It is widely believed that one cannot derive an "ought" from an "is", i.e., that facts about the world can never determine what one should do (Hume's Law). By contrast, insofar as a fact is understood to relate to an institution (marriage, promises, commitments, etc.), which is to be understood as a system of constitutive rules, then what one should do can be understood as following from the institutional fact of what one has done; institutional fact, then, can be understood as opposed to the "brute facts" related to Hume's Law. For example, Searle believes that promising to do something means one must do it, because by making the promise one participates in the constitutive rules that arrange the system of promise-making itself; a "shouldness" is implicit in the action of promising. Furthermore, he believes this provides a desire-independent reason for an action: if one orders a drink at a bar, there is an obligation to pay for it even if one has no desire to do so. This argument, which he first made in his paper "How to Derive 'Ought' from 'Is'" (1964), is highly controversial, but Searle maintained that "the traditional metaphysical distinction between fact and value cannot be captured by the linguistic distinction between 'evaluative' and 'descriptive' because all such speech act notions are already normative".

Third, Searle argues that much of rational deliberation involves adjusting patterns of desires, which are often inconsistent, to decide between outcomes, not the other way around. While in the Classical Model one starts from viewing a desire to go to Paris as more important than saving money, which leads to calculating the cheapest way to get there, Searle argues that people weigh the desire to visit Paris against the desire to save money to determine which they value more. Hence, he believes that rationality is not a system of rules, but more of an adverb. Certain behaviors are seen as rational no matter their source, and a system of rules derives from finding patterns in what is considered rational.

=== Searle–Derrida debate ===
After Jacques Derrida, in his 1972 paper "Signature Event Context," responded to J. L. Austin's theory of the illocutionary act, Searle argued in his 1977 essay "Reiterating the Differences: A Reply to Derrida" that Derrida's apparent rejection of Austin was unwarranted. Searle later refused to let his 1977 reply be printed along with Derrida's papers in the 1988 collection Limited Inc, in which a new text by Derrida critiqued Searle's positions. In the 1990s, Searle elaborated on why he did not consider Derrida's approach legitimate philosophy.

== Bibliography ==
- Speech Acts: An Essay in the Philosophy of Language (1969), Cambridge University Press, ISBN 978-0-521-09626-3
- The Campus War: A Sympathetic Look at the University in Agony (political commentary; 1971)
- Expression and Meaning: Studies in the Theory of Speech Acts (essay collection; 1979)
- Intentionality: An Essay in the Philosophy of Mind (1983)
- Minds, Brains and Science: The 1984 Reith Lectures (lecture collection; 1984)
- Foundations of Illocutionary Logic (John Searle & Daniel Vanderveken 1985)
- The Rediscovery of the Mind (1992)
- The Construction of Social Reality (1995)
- The Mystery of Consciousness (review collection; 1997)
- Mind, Language and Society: Philosophy in the Real World (summary of earlier work; 1998)
- Rationality in Action (2001)
- Consciousness and Language (essay collection; 2002)
- Freedom and Neurobiology (lecture collection; 2004)
- Mind: A Brief Introduction (summary of work in philosophy of mind; 2004)
- Philosophy in a New Century: Selected Essays (2008)
- Making the Social World: The Structure of Human Civilization (2010)
- "What Your Computer Can't Know" (review of Luciano Floridi, The Fourth Revolution: How the Infosphere Is Reshaping Human Reality, Oxford University Press, 2014; and Nick Bostrom, Superintelligence: Paths, Dangers, Strategies, Oxford University Press, 2014), The New York Review of Books, vol. LXI, no. 15 (October 9, 2014), pp. 52–55.
- Seeing Things As They Are: A Theory of Perception (2015)

== See also ==
- American philosophy
- Consciousness
- Language/action perspective
- List of American philosophers
- List of Jean Nicod Prize laureates
- Performative turn
- Practical reason
- Pragmatics
- Unconscious mind

== Sources ==
- John Searle and His Critics (Ernest Lepore and Robert Van Gulick, eds.; 1991)
- John Searle (Barry Smith, ed.; 2003)
- John Searle and the Construction of Social Reality (Joshua Rust; 2006)
- John Searle's Philosophy of Language: Force, Meaning, and Mind (Savas L. Tsohatzidis, ed.; 2007)
- Intentional Acts and Institutional Facts: Essays on John Searle's Social Ontology (Savas L. Tsohatzidis, ed.; 2007)
- Searle's Philosophy and Chinese Philosophy: Constructive Engagement (Bo Mou, ed.; 2008)
- John Searle (Joshua Rust; 2009)
