= Speech act =

Utterance that serves a performative function

In the philosophy of language and linguistics, a speech act is something expressed by an individual that not only presents information but performs an action as well. The phrase "I resign" is a classic example of a speech act, as the very act of saying the words enacts the resignation.

According to Kent Bach, "almost any speech act is really the performance of several acts at once, distinguished by different aspects of the speaker's intention: there is the act of saying something, what one does in saying it, such as requesting or promising, and how one is trying to affect one's audience".

The contemporary use of the term speech act goes back to J. L. Austin's development of performative utterances and his theory of locutionary, illocutionary, and perlocutionary acts. Speech acts serve their function once they are said or communicated. These are commonly taken to include acts such as apologizing, promising, ordering, answering, requesting, complaining, warning, inviting, refusing, and congratulating.

== History ==
For much of the history of the positivist philosophy of language, language was viewed primarily as a way of making factual assertions, and the other uses of language tended to be ignored, as Austin states at the beginning of Lecture 1, "It was for too long the assumption of philosophers that the business of a 'statement' can only be to 'describe' some state of affairs, or to 'state some fact', which it must do either truly or falsely." Wittgenstein came up with the idea of "don't ask for the meaning, ask for the use," showing language as a new vehicle for social activity. Speech act theory hails from Wittgenstein's philosophical theories. Wittgenstein believed meaning derives from pragmatic tradition, demonstrating the importance of how language is used to accomplish objectives within specific situations. By following rules to accomplish a goal, communication becomes a set of language games. Thus, utterances do more than reflect a meaning, they are words designed to get things done. The work of J. L. Austin, particularly his How to Do Things with Words, led philosophers to pay more attention to the non-declarative uses of language. The terminology he introduced, especially the notions "locutionary act", "illocutionary act", and "perlocutionary act", occupied an important role in what was then to become the "study of speech acts". All of these three acts, but especially the "illocutionary act", are nowadays commonly classified as "speech acts".

Austin was by no means the first one to deal with what one could call "speech acts" in a wider sense. The term social act and some of the theory of this type of linguistic action are to be found in the fifth of Thomas Reid's Essays on the Active Powers of the Human Mind (1788, chapter VI, Of the Nature of a Contract).

Adolf Reinach (1883–1917) and Stanislav Škrabec (1844–1918) have been both independently credited with a fairly comprehensive account of social acts as performative utterances dating to 1913, long before Austin and Searle.

The term speech act had also been already used by Karl Bühler.

Georg Wilhelm Friedrich Hegel (1770–1831) views speech as an act: ("[…] sprechen ist so nicht bloß sprechen, sondern handeln, indem ich mich an die Vorstellung wende, und diese das Erzeugende einer Wirklichkeit ist, so bin ich das Erhaltende oder Zerstörende." – "[…] speaking thus is not merely speaking, but acting, in that I turn to the imagination, which is the generator of an actuality, so I am the sustainer or destroyer [of this actuality]." (Lectures on the Philosophy of Right III, GW 26,3, p. 1467).

== Overview ==
Speech acts can be analysed on multiple levels:

1. A locutionary act: the performance of an utterance: the actual utterance and its apparent meaning, comprising any and all of its verbal, social, and rhetorical meanings, all of which correspond to the verbal, syntactic and semantic aspects of any meaningful utterance;
2. an illocutionary act: the active result of the implied request or meaning presented by the locutionary act. For example, if the locutionary act in an interaction is the question "Is there any salt?" the implied illocutionary request is "Please pass the salt to me." or at least "I wish to add salt to my meal.";
3. and under certain conditions a further perlocutionary act: the actual effect of the locutionary and illocutionary acts, such as persuading, convincing, scaring, enlightening, inspiring, or otherwise getting someone to do or realize something, whether intended or not.
4. Additionally, a metalocutionary act categorizes speech acts that refer to the forms and functions of the discourse itself rather than continuing the substantive development of the discourse, or to the configurational functions of prosody and punctuation.

=== Illocutionary acts ===
The concept of an illocutionary act is central to the concept of a speech act. Although there are several scholarly opinions regarding how to define illocutionary acts, there are some kinds of acts that are widely accepted as illocutionary. Examples of these widely accepted acts are commands or promises.

The first of these opinions is the one held by John L. Austin who coined the term speech act in his book How to Do Things with Words published posthumously in 1962. According to Austin's preliminary informal description, the idea of an illocutionary act can be captured by emphasizing that "by saying something, we do something", as when someone issues an order to someone to go by saying "Go!", or when a minister joins two people in marriage saying, "I now pronounce you husband and wife." (Austin would eventually define the "illocutionary act" in a more exact manner.)

John R. Searle gave an alternative to Austin's explanation of the illocutionary act, saying a speech act is often meant to refer to exactly the same thing as the term illocutionary act. Searle's work on speech acts is understood to further refine Austin's conception. However, some philosophers have pointed out a significant difference between the two conceptions: whereas Austin emphasized the conventional interpretation of speech acts, Searle emphasized a psychological interpretation (based on beliefs, intentions, etc.).

=== Perlocutionary acts ===
While illocutionary acts relate more to the speaker, perlocutionary acts are centered around the listener. Perlocutionary acts always have a perlocutionary effect, which is the effect a speech act has on a listener. This could affect the listener's thoughts, emotions or even their physical actions. An example of this could be if someone uttered the sentence "I'm hungry." The perlocutionary effect on the listener could be the effect of being persuaded by the utterance. For example, after hearing the utterance, the listener could be persuaded to make a sandwich for the speaker.

=== Performative speech acts ===
An interesting type of illocutionary speech act is that performed in the utterance of what Austin calls performative utterances, typical instances of which are "I nominate John to be President", "I sentence you to ten years' imprisonment", or "I promise to pay you back." In these typical, rather explicit cases of performative sentences, the action that the sentence describes (nominating, sentencing, promising) is performed by the utterance of the sentence itself. J.L. Austin claimed that performative sentences could be "happy or unhappy". They were only happy if the speaker does the actions he or she talks about. They were unhappy if this did not happen. Performative speech acts also use explicit verbs instead of implicit ones. For example, stating "I intend to go." does convey information, but it does not really mean that you are [e.g.] promising to go; so it does not count as "performing" an action ("such as" the action of promising to go). Therefore, it [the word "intend"] is an implicit verb; i.e., a verb that would not be suitable for use in performative speech acts.

=== Indirect speech acts ===
In the course of performing speech acts people communicate with each other. The content of communication may be identical, or almost identical, with the content intended to be communicated, as when a stranger asks, "What is your name?" However, the meaning of the linguistic means used may also be different from the content intended to be communicated. One may, in appropriate circumstances, request Peter to do the dishes by just saying, "Peter ...!", or one can promise to do the dishes by saying, "Me!"

One common way of performing speech acts is to use an expression, which indicates one speech act, and indeed performs this act, but also performs a further speech act, which is indirect. One may, for instance, say, "Peter, can you close the window?", thereby asking Peter whether he will be able to close the window, but also requesting that he does so. Since the request is performed indirectly, by means of (directly) performing a question, it counts as an indirect speech act.

An even more indirect way of making such a request would be to say, in Peter's presence in the room with the open window, "I'm cold." The speaker of this request must rely upon Peter's understanding of several items of information that is not explicit: that the window is open and is the cause of them being cold, that being cold is an uncomfortable sensation and they wish it to be taken care of, and that Peter cares to rectify this situation by closing the window. This, of course, depends much on the relationship between the requester and Peter—he might understand the request differently if they were his boss at work than if they were his girlfriend or boyfriend at home. The more presumed information pertaining to the request, the more indirect the speech act may be considered to be.

Indirect speech acts are commonly used to reject proposals and to make requests. For example, if a speaker asks, "Would you like to meet me for coffee?" and the other replies, "I have class", the second speaker has used an indirect speech act to reject the proposal. This is indirect because the literal meaning of "I have class" does not entail any sort of rejection. In addition to ordinary conversation, indirect speech acts also appear in institutional and commercial settings. For instance, fieldwork on marketplace discourse documents vendors attracting customers through non-verbal cues such as music and ambient scents—thereby achieving persuasive goals without explicit verbal requests. More generally, many languages employ conventionalized request forms (e.g., "Could you…?" or "Would you mind…?") to mitigate imposition, while speakers may also rely on contextual hints (e.g., "It's cold in here") to elicit actions such as closing a window.

Such cases raise a well-known problem for linguistic theory: how do hearers reliably recover the intended illocution from literal content that appears to mean something else? In a seminal proposal, in 1975 John Searle suggested that the illocutionary force of indirect speech acts can be derived by means of a Gricean reasoning process; however, the process he proposes does not seem to accurately solve the problem.

In other words, this means that one does not need to say the words apologize, pledge, or praise in order to show they are doing the action. All the examples above show how the actions and indirect words make something happen rather than coming out straightforward with specific words and saying it.

== Examples ==
Speech acts are commonplace in everyday interactions and are important for communication, as well as present in many different contexts. Examples of these include:

- "You're fired!" expresses both the employment status of the individual in question, as well as the action by which said person's employment is ended.
- "I hereby appoint you as chairman" expresses both the status of the individual as chairman, and the action that promotes the individual to this position.
- "We ask that you extinguish your cigarettes at this time, and bring your tray tables and seatbacks to an upright position." This statement describes the requirements of the current location, such as an aeroplane, while also issuing the command to stop smoking and to sit up straight.
- "Would it be too much trouble for me to ask you to hand me that wrench?" functions to simultaneously ask two questions. The first is to ask the listener if they are capable of passing the wrench, while the second is an actual request.
- "Well, would you listen to that?" acts as a question, requesting that a listener heed what is being said by the speaker, but also as an exclamation of disbelief or shock.

== In language development ==
In 1975 John Dore proposed that children's utterances were realizations of one of nine primitive speech acts:

1. labelling
2. repeating
3. answering
4. requesting (action)
5. requesting (answer)
6. calling
7. greeting
8. protesting
9. practicing

== Formalization ==
There is no agreed formalization of Speech Act theory. In 1985, John Searle and D. Vandervecken attempted to give some grounds of an illocutionary logic. Other attempts have been proposed by Per Martin-Löf for a treatment of the concept of assertion inside intuitionistic type theory, and by Carlo Dalla Pozza, with a proposal of a formal pragmatics connecting propositional content (given with classical semantics) and illocutionary force (given by intuitionistic semantics). Up to now the main basic formal applications of speech act theory are to be found in the field of human–computer interaction in chatboxes and other tools. Recent work in artificial intelligence proposes a Bayesian approach to formalize speech acts.

== In computer science ==
In 1991, computational speech act models of human–computer conversation were developed, and in 2004 speech act theory was used to model conversations for automated classification and retrieval.

=== Conversation for action ===
Another highly influential view of speech acts has been in the conversation for action developed by Terry Winograd and Fernando Flores in their 1986 text "Understanding Computers and Cognition: A New Foundation for Design". Arguably the most important part of their analysis lies in a state-transition diagram in Chapter 5, that Winograd and Flores claim underlies the significant illocutionary (speech act) claims of two parties attempting to coordinate action with one another, no matter whether the agents involved might be human–human, human–computer, or computer–computer.

A key part of this analysis is the contention that one dimension of the social domain-tracking the illocutionary status of the transaction (whether individual participants claim that their interests have been met, or not) is very readily conferred to a computer process, regardless of whether the computer has the means to adequately represent the real world issues underlying that claim. Thus a computer instantiating the conversation for action has the useful ability to model the status of the current social reality independent of any external reality on which social claims may be based.

This transactional view of speech acts has significant applications in many areas in which (human) individuals have had different roles, for instance, a patient and a physician might meet in an encounter in which the patient makes a request for treatment, the physician responds with a counter-offer involving a treatment they feel is appropriate, and the patient might respond, etc. Such a conversation for action can describe a situation in which an external observer (such as a computer or health information system) may be able to track the illocutionary (or speech act) status of negotiations between the patient and physician participants even in the absence of any adequate model of the illness or proposed treatments. The key insight provided by Winograd and Flores is that the state-transition diagram representing the social (Illocutionary) negotiation of the two parties involved is generally much, much simpler than any model representing the world in which those parties are making claims; in short, the system tracking the status of the conversation for action need not be concerned with modeling all of the realities of the external world. A conversation for action is critically dependent upon certain stereotypical claims about the status of the world made by the two parties. Thus a conversation for action can be readily tracked and facilitated by a device with little or no ability to model circumstances in the real world other than the ability to register claims by specific agents about a domain.

=== Rules ===
In the past, philosophy has discussed rules for when expressions are used. The two rules are constitutive and regulative rules.

The concept of constitutive rules finds its origin in Wittgenstein and John Rawls, and has been elaborated by G.C.J. Midgley, Max Black, G.H. von Wright, David Shwayder, and John Searle.

Whereas regulative rules are prescriptions that regulate a pre-existing activity (whose existence is logically independent of the rules), constitutive rules constitute an activity the existence of which is logically dependent on the rules.

For example: traffic rules are regulative rules that prescribe certain behaviour in order to regulate the traffic. Without these rules, however, the traffic would not cease to be. In contrast: the rules of chess are constitutive rules that constitute the game. Without these rules chess would not exist, since the game is logically dependent on the rules.

=== In multiagent universes ===
Multi-agent systems sometimes use speech act labels to express the intent of an agent when it sends a message to another agent. For example, the intent "inform" in the message "inform(content)" may be interpreted as a request that the receiving agent adds the item "content" to its knowledge-base; this is in contrast to the message "query(content)", which may be interpreted (depending on the semantics employed) as a request to see if the item content is currently in the receiving agents knowledge base. There are at least two standardisations of speech act labelled messaging: KQML and FIPA.

KQML and FIPA are based on the Searlian, that is, psychological semantics of speech acts. Munindar P. Singh has long advocated moving away from the psychological to a social semantics of speech acts—one that would be in tune with Austin's conception. Andrew Jones has also been a critic of the psychological conception. A recent collection of manifestos by researchers in agent communication reflects a growing recognition in the multiagent systems community of the benefits of a social semantics.

=== Other uses in technology ===
- An office can be seen as a system of speech acts. The abbreviation SAMPO stands for Speech-Act-based office Modeling approach, which "studies office activities as a series of speech acts creating, maintaining, modifying, reporting, and terminating commitments".
- Speech act profiling has been used to detect deception in synchronous computer-mediated communication.

== In political science ==
In political science, the Copenhagen School adopts speech act as a form of felicitous speech act (or simply 'facilitating conditions'), whereby the speaker, often politicians or players, act in accordance to the truth but in preparation for the audience to take action in the directions of the player that are driven or incited by the act. This forms an observable framework under a specified subject matter from the player, and the audience who are 'under-theorised [would] remain outside of the framework itself, and would benefit from being both brought in and drawn out.' It is because the audience would not be informed of the intentions of the player, except to focus on the display of the speech act itself. Therefore, in the perspective of the player, the truth of the subject matter is irrelevant except the result produced via the audience.

The study of speech acts is prevalent in legal theory since laws themselves can be interpreted as speech acts. Laws issue out a command to their constituents, which can be realized as an action. When forming a legal contract, speech acts can be made when people are making or accepting an offer. Considering the theory of freedom of speech, some speech acts may not be legally protected. For example, a death threat is a type of speech act and is considered to exist outside of the protection of freedom of speech as it is treated as a criminal act.

== In economic sociology ==
In a sociological perspective, Nicolas Brisset adopts the concept of speech act in order to understand how economic models participate in the making and the spreading of representations inside and outside of the scientific field. Brisset argues that models perform actions in different fields (scientific, academic, practical, and political). This multiplicity of fields induces a variety of felicity conditions and types of performed actions. This perspective is a criticism of the essentialism of philosophical modelling studies. This approach is largely inspired by the work of Pierre Bourdieu and Quentin Skinner.

In finance, it is possible to understand mathematical models as speech acts: in 2016 the notion of "financial Logos" was defined as the speech act of mathematical modelling of financial risks. The action of the financial Logos on financial practices is the framing of financial decision-making by risk modelling.

== See also ==
- Analogy – Form of figurative language
- Cooperative principle – Pragmatics of conversational communication
- Dialog act – Type of speech act
- Direction of fit – Concept in the philosophy of language
- Discourse-completion task
- Entailment (pragmatics) – Concept in linguistics
- Implicature – Information conveyed verbally yet not literally
- How to Do Things with Words – 1955 lecture series on speech acts by J. L. Austin
- Metaphor – Figure of speech of implicit comparison
- Performative verb – Verbs carried out through being uttered
- Phatic expression – Utterances which primarily serve a social function
- Presupposition – Assumed context surrounding an utterance
- Politeness theory – Social and linguistic theory of politeness
- Relevance theory – Theory of cognitive linguistics
- Speech crimes – Criminalized form of communication

== Bibliography ==
- John Langshaw Austin: How to Do Things With Words. Cambridge (Mass.) 1962, paperback: Harvard University Press, 2nd edition, 2005, ISBN 0-674-41152-8.
- William P. Alston: 'Illocutionary Acts and Sentence Meaning'. Ithaca: Cornell University Press 2000, ISBN 0-8014-3669-9.
- Bach, Kent. "Speech Acts." Speech Acts. Routledge Encyclopedia of Philosophy, n.d. Web. 10 Feb. 2014.
- Doerge, Friedrich Christoph. Illocutionary Acts – Austin's Account and What Searle Made Out of It. . Tuebingen 2006.
- Dorschel, Andreas, 'What is it to understand a directive speech act?', in: Australasian Journal of Philosophy LXVII (1989), nr. 3, pp. 319–340.
- John Searle, Speech Acts, Cambridge University Press 1969, ISBN 0-521-09626-X.
- John Searle, "Indirect speech acts." In Syntax and Semantics, 3: Speech Acts, ed. P. Cole & J. L. Morgan, pp. 59–82. New York: Academic Press. (1975). Reprinted in Pragmatics: A Reader, ed. S. Davis, pp. 265–277. Oxford: Oxford University Press. (1991)
- Geo Siegwart, "Alethic Acts and Alethiological Reflection. An Outline of Constructive Philosophy of Truth." In Truth and Speech Acts: Studies in the philosophy of language, ed. D. Greimann & G. Siegwart, pp. 41–58. New York: Routledge. (2007)
- Terry Winograd & Fernando Flores, Understanding Computers and Cognition: A New Foundation for Design, Ablex Publishing Corp, (Norwood), 1986. ISBN 0-89391-050-3.
- Birgit Erler: The speech act of forbidding and its realizations: A linguistic analysis. Saarbrücken: VDM Verlag Dr. Müller, 2010, ISBN 978-3-639-23275-2.
- Robert Maximilian de Gaynesford: Illocutionary acts, Subordination, and Silencing in Analysis, July 2009.
- Outi, Malmivuori: Zu Stand und Entwicklung der Sprechakttheorie. Zu Grundsätzen der Theorie des spachlichen Handelns. AkademikerVerlag. 2012. ISBN 978-3-639-44043-0.
- Matt McDonald: Securitisation and the Construction of Security. University of Warwick. (2008)
- Barry Buzan, Ole Waever & Jaap de Wilde: Security: A New Framework for Analysis. Colorado Boulder: Lynne Rienner. (1998)
