= Perlocutionary act =

Effect of an utterance on an interlocutor

A perlocutionary act (or perlocutionary effect) is the effect of an utterance on an interlocutor (listener). Examples of perlocutionary acts include persuading, convincing, scaring, enlightening, inspiring, or otherwise affecting the interlocutor. Words can insinuate an action or an emotion in the listener, whether or not it was the speaker's intention. The perlocutionary effect of an utterance is contrasted with the locutionary act, which is the act of producing the utterance (articulating/speaking), and with the illocutionary force, which does not depend on the utterance's effect on the interlocutor.

As an example, consider the following utterance: "By the way, I have a CD of Debussy; would you like to borrow it?" Its illocutionary function is an offer, while its intended perlocutionary effect might be to impress the interlocutor, or to show a friendly attitude, or encourage an interest in a particular type of music. The actual perlocutionary effect can be different from the intended perlocutionary effect. The speaker of such a sentence may intend to exhibit a friendly attitude, but a listener might become irritated if they suppose the speaker's intention is snobbishly to impress them.
