= Carlo Lottieri =

Italian political philosopher (born 1960)

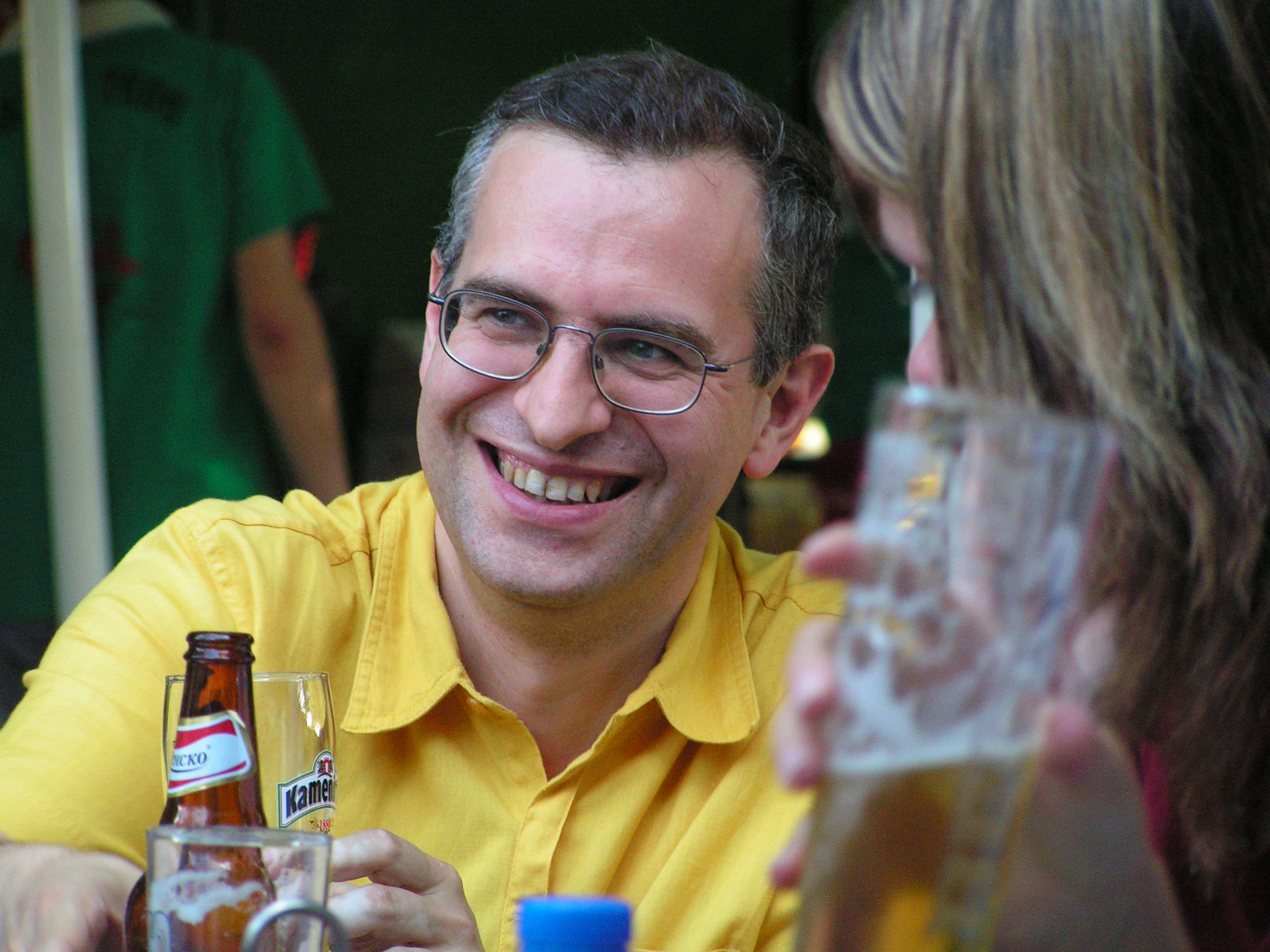
- Born: 6 November 1960 (age 65); Brescia, Lombardy, Italy

Philosophical work
- Era: Contemporary philosophy
- Region: Western philosophy Italian philosophy
- School: Libertarianism
- Institutions: Bruno Leoni Institute; Mises Institute
- Main interests: Philosophy of law · Federalism · Political theology · Elite theory

Carlo Lottieri (born 6 November 1960) is Professor of Political Philosophy at the Università Pegaso. Born in Brescia, he holds a bachelor's degree (summa cum laude) in Philosophy from the University of Genoa, a M.A. from the Institut Universitaire d’Etudes Européens (now attached to the University of Geneva), a M.A. and a Ph.D. from the Paris-Sorbonne University. His research interests cover philosophy of law, federalism, American-style libertarianism, political theology, religion and public life, military ethics, elitism, evolutionary theory of law, commons and private property, and the modern state. He edited many works by Bruno Leoni in English, French, Italian, Spanish, and Czech. He is Professor of Philosophy of Law at the University of Verona, and Professor of Philosophy of Law and Philosophy of Social Sciences at Facoltà di Teologia di Lugano.

== Career and thought ==
In the years 2003–04, Lottieri taught Philosophy of Social Sciences at Ca' Foscari University of Venice, and in 2011 became visiting professor at Aix-en-Provence. Fellow of many institutions, he is the Director of Political Theory department of the Istituto Bruno Leoni (IBL), based in Turin. Lottieri's research develops a radical American-style libertarianism combining a strong emphasis on the inviolability of other people (marked by the influence of Emmanuel Lévinas) and a realistic approach to the modern state, largely influenced by Italian elitist school, Carl Schmitt's scholarship, and public choice and Austrian School economists. Following Raimondo Cubeddu and Alberto Mingardi, in his work Lottieri "argues for the legitimacy of many so-called 'monopolistic practices' (cartels, monopolization, mergers, predatory pricing…), and for the legitimacy of conglomerates, and big business at large, vis-à-vis those governmental agencies built to thoroughly implement 'competition' from top to bottom." His last book emphasizes the historic features of the modern state, suggesting to libertarian scholars to understand the cultural and even theological implications of the struggle between the rulers and the ruled.

== Publications ==
=== Single-authored books ===
- Un'idea elvetica di libertà. Nella crisi della modernità europea. Brescia: La Scuola, 2017.
- Every New Right Is A Freedom Lost. e-book, translated by Chiara Brown, 2016.
- Credere nello Stato? Teologia politica e dissimulazione da Filippo il Bello a WikiLeaks. Soveria Mannelli: Rubbettino, 2011.
- Le ragioni del diritto. Libertà individuale e ordine giuridico nel pensiero di Bruno Leoni. Treviglio – Soveria Mannelli: Facco – Rubbettino, 2006.
- Il pensiero libertario contemporaneo. Tesi e controversie sulla filosofia, sul diritto e sul mercato. Macerata: Liberilibri, 2001
- Denaro e comunità. Relazioni di mercato e ordinamenti giuridici nella società liberale. Naples: Guida, 2000.

=== Edited books ===
- (with Jo Ann Cavallo), Speaking Truth to Power from Medieval to Modern Italy (Annali di Italianistica), volume 34, October 2016.
- Bruno Leoni, Law, Liberty and the Competitive Market, with a preface by Richard A. Epstein, New Brunswick NJ, Transaction, 2008.

=== Co-authored books ===
- (written with Piercamillo Falasca) Come il federalismo fiscale può salvare il Mezzogiorno. Soveria Mannelli: Rubbettino, 2008.
- (written with Emanuele Castrucci) Lezioni di Filosofia del diritto. Rome: Aracne, 2006.
- Dove va il pensiero libertario?, edited by Riccardo Paradisi. Rome: Settimo Sigillo, 2004.
- (written with Enrico Diciotti) Rothbard e l’ordine giuridico libertario. Una discussione. Siena: DiGips – Università degli Studi di Siena, 2002.

=== Journal articles, book chapters, working papers, academic conference papers ===
- "European Unification as the New Frontier of Collectivism: The Case for Competitive Federalism and Polycentric Law", Journal of Libertarian Studies, volume 16, no. 1, 2002, pp. 23–43.
- "Vatican City as A Free Society: Legal Order and Political Theology", working paper, The Ludwig von Mises Institute, 2005.
- "Classical Natural Law and Libertarian Theory: Toward an Integration of Rothbard and Leoni", in Joerg Guido Huelsmann - Stephan Kinsella, eds., Property, Freedom, Society. Essays in Honor of Hans-Hermann Hoppe, Auburn, The Ludwig von Mises Institute, 2010.
- "Just War and Rothbardian Libertarianism", Encyclopedia of Military Ethics, edited by Alexander Moseley, 2011.
- Review of Toward a Truly Free Market: A Distributist Perspective on the Role of Government, Taxes, Health Care, Deficits, and More by John C. Médaille, Journal of Markets & Morality, Volume 14, Number 1, Spring 2011, pp. 221–222.
