= Cooler Heads Coalition =

Front group of the climate change denial movement

The Cooler Heads Coalition is a politically conservative "informal and ad-hoc group" in the United States, financed and operated by the Competitive Enterprise Institute. The group, which rejects the scientific consensus on climate change, made efforts to stop the government from addressing climate change.

== Operation ==
The Coalition operates a website, and published a blog and e-newsletter Cooler Heads Digest (last issued in 2012). It was founded by Consumer Alert.

The Cooler Heads Coalition describes itself as "an informal and ad-hoc group focused on dispelling the myths of global warming by exposing flawed economic, scientific, and risk analysis".

== Reception ==
The Washington Post described the group as "in the vanguard of efforts to cast doubt on the gravity of climate change and thwart government efforts to address it." The New Yorker has described the Cooler Heads Coalition as "an umbrella organization operated by the Competitive Enterprise Institute, a nonprofit that prides itself on its opposition to environmentalists."

According to The Washington Post, the group was for "long dismissed as cranks by mainstream scientists and politicians in both parties" until the group was embraced by Donald Trump's 2016 presidential campaign. The Cooler Heads Coalition has been criticized for ties to energy industries that would be affected if the United States enacted any legislation targeted at reducing CO_{2} emissions.

== Membership ==
Notable members of the Coalition have included:

- 60 Plus Association
- Alexis de Tocqueville Institution
- Americans for Prosperity
- Americans for Tax Reform
- American Legislative Exchange Council
- Committee for a Constructive Tomorrow
- Competitive Enterprise Institute
- Fraser Institute
- FreedomWorks
- George C. Marshall Institute
- The Heartland Institute
- Independent Institute
- Istituto Bruno Leoni
- JunkScience.com
- Lavoisier Group
- Liberty Institute
- National Center for Policy Analysis
- National Center for Public Policy Research

== See also ==
- Climate change in the United States
- Climate change denial
