= John Hardwig =

John Hardwig is a retired philosopher who was head of the philosophy department at the University of Tennessee. He has published widely on bioethics, end of life issues and the notion of epistemic dependency and the role of experts. He is best known for a 1997 article proposing that individuals have a duty to die in situations when those who love them would have their lives seriously compromised by continuing to take care of them.

In much of his writings, he calls for the learning of a "dying art", which he describes as becoming necessary at a time when death comes too late, rather than too early. This phenomenon is often referred to as the 'fourth phase' of the epidemiological transition. He frequently argued that there are cases in which there exists a right to die, especially when prolonging life imposes a great burden on loved ones. His arguments have been very influential among contemporary philosophers.
