= Sergio Ricossa =

Italian economist

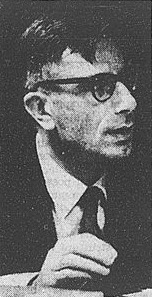
- Born: 6 June 1927; Turin, Italy
- Died: 2 March 2016 (aged 88); Turin, Italy
- Occupation: Economist

Sergio Ricossa (6 June 1927 – 2 March 2016) was an Italian economist.

Born in Turin, in 1949 Ricossa graduated in economics at the Turin University. In 1961 he was nominated associate professor of economic policy and financial discipline in the same university, becoming ordinary professor in 1963.

A proponent of an economic liberalism without compromises, Ricossa's studies mainly focused on the theory of value. He collaborated with several magazines and with the newspapers Il Giornale and La Stampa, where his provocative articles often raised criticism and polemics.

Ricossa was a Vice President of the Mont Pelerin Society, a member of the Accademia dei Lincei, and the honorary president of the Bruno Leoni Institute.
