= Butterfly Economics =

Book by Paul Ormerod

Butterfly Economics: A New General Theory of Social and Economic Behavior
- First edition
- Author: Paul Ormerod
- Language: English
- Subject: Economics
- Publisher: Faber and Faber Limited
- Publication date: 1998
- Publication place: United Kingdom
- Pages: 217
- ISBN: 0-571-19005-7
- OCLC: 40624765
- Dewey Decimal: 330.1 Economics

Butterfly Economics: A New General Theory of Social and Economic Behavior is a book by Paul Ormerod dealing with economic theory, published in 1998. The author uses a plethora of insect-related metaphors to show that an economy tends to function like a living organism and is thus able to learn and to adapt.

The theory presented by the book departs from conventional economic wisdom which understands individuals as isolated decision makers who act based on a rational evaluation of sufficient information about cost and benefits of respective choices. Butterfly economics adds interaction to the equation and argues that individuals interact when pursuing their interests, thereby gaining new information, which in turn influences their decision-making.
