= Consumer Alert =

American non-profit organization

- Formation: 1977
- Type: 501(C)(3) Corporation
- Location(s): 3050 K Street NW; Washington, DC
- Region served: United States
- Chairman: William C. MacLeod
- Website: consumeralert.org
- Remarks: (domain expired after 2006-02-17)

Consumer Alert was an American non-profit organization which advocated on business and consumer issues. It was primarily funded by corporations. It was founded in 1977 by Barbara A. Keating-Edh and John Henry Sununu, who would later go on to become Governor of New Hampshire (1983–1989) and White House Chief of Staff during the George H. W. Bush administration.

The philosophy of Consumer Alert advocated free-market solutions to consumer dissatisfaction and promoted the belief that markets are best regulated by informed consumers. In the organization's opinion effective consumer advocacy must steadfastly oppose any actions by government or industry that limits competition within markets.

Consumer Alert considered itself a conservative opponent to the liberal political bent of mainstream consumer advocacy. Speaking of the legislation advocated by other consumer organizations Consumer Alert President Barbara A. Keating-Edh said:

The regulations ignore the fact that auto accidents are caused by unsafe drivers, not unsafe cars. Accidents involving children are caused by unattentive parents. Home fires are caused by careless smokers, not dangerous furniture. ...The no-growth movement that is playing havoc with our freedoms gains momentum by fanning public paranoia and by doting on those persons who can't be happy unless they believe they are being poisoned by someone who is earning a profit.

The organization sued anti-nuclear-power activists in attempts to make protesters pay for the police presence at demonstrations.

Consumer Alert was originally based in Darien, Connecticut. During much of its existence its offices were located in Washington, DC.

The organization published a bimonthly newsletter titled Consumer Comments with ISSN 0740-4964. Articles from some issues are available online at TheFreeLibrary.com.

In 1989 Sununu was succeeded as Chairman by attorney William C. MacLeod who would later become director of the Federal Trade Commission's Bureau of Consumer Protection.

As of July 2010 the web-based organization registry of the Department of Consumer and Regulatory Affairs (DCRA) of Washington, DC, for the registration of Consumer Alert, Inc., file number 770925, shows status "revoked". The DCRA site defines "revoked" as: "An involuntary termination of charter or authority."

Consumer Alert has partially funded the Cooler Heads Coalition's website, globalwarming.org.

== Financial Information ==
United States IRS forms 990 for Consumer Alert Inc.
Organization Name	State	Year	Total Assets	Form	Pages	EIN
Consumer Alert Inc. - 2002	DC	2002	$36,189	990	20	06-0961299
Consumer Alert Inc. - 2003	DC	2003	$37,190	990	19	06-0961299
Consumer Alert Inc. - 2004	DC	2004	$34,047	990	16	06-0961299
