= Why Most Things Fail =

- First edition
- Author: Paul Ormerod
- Original title: Why Most Things Fail: Evolution, Extinction And Economics
- Language: English
- Publisher: Faber & Faber
- Publication date: April 7, 2005
- Media type: Print, e-book
- Pages: 255
- ISBN: 9780571220120
- OCLC: 856654133

Why Most Things Fail: Evolution, Extinction and Economics is a 255-page book published in 2005 by Paul Ormerod.

== Content ==
The book observes that failures are common, and it often happens because the risk of unpredictability and uncertainty is often ignored. To consider the risk of these uncertainties, that is also proven through game theory, patterns should be analyzed and the connectivity of the parts of a complex system should be ensured. Also, book says appropriate outlooks and positive attitudes to a system on the emphasis of innovation and change rather than stability is needed.The author thinks educated guesses and building the capacity to handle failures is more important.

== Legacy ==
Why Most Things Fail does for business collapse what years of journalism have done for business success. It identifies the subtle patterns that comprise the apparent disorder of failures and analyzes how they occur. The book was named a Business Book of the Year 2006 by Business Week.
