= Bruno Leoni Institute =

Italian think tank

- Type: Think-tank
- Purpose: Ordoliberalism, Austrian School, classical liberalism
- Headquarters: Piazza Cavour 3, Turin; Piazza Castello 23, Milan
- President: Franco Debenedetti
- Director General: Alberto Mingardi
- Key people: Carlo Lottieri, Nicola Rossi, Antonio Martino, Sergio Ricossa
- Affiliations: Cooler Heads Coalition, Atlas Network, EPICENTER
- Website: www.brunoleoni.it

The Bruno Leoni Institute, named after philosopher and scholar Bruno Leoni, is an Italian libertarian think-tank promoting classical liberal ideas in Italy and in Europe. It was founded in 2003 by three libertarian scholars Carlo Lottieri, Alberto Mingardi and Carlo Stagnaro. IBL organizes conferences, publishes books, briefings and academic papers, and assists undergraduate and graduate students with their research work.

It is regarded as the most important Italian think-tank that promotes climate change denial and delay.

== About ==
IBL was established in 2003 to promote free-market ideas. In particular, as stated on its website, the Institute aims to “contribute to the Italian political discourse, to enable a proper appreciation of the role of liberty and private enterprise as pillars of a more prosperous and open society”.

The Institute is an Italian libertarian public policy research organization, structured on the model of US think tanks such as the Cato Institute. Through its policy papers, seminars and publishing activities, the Institute aims to offer a fruitful contribution to the Italian and European political debate. In particular, IBL is dedicated to promoting the principles of individual freedom, limited government and free markets and its philosophy is based on Bruno Leoni’s thoughts and ideas.

In its latest 2016 "Global Go To Think Tank Index Report" the University of Pennsylvania ranked IBL as the 113th most influential think-tank in the world, out of more than 6,600 institutes. On a European and global level, IBL is part of a broader international network of research centres informed by the same free-market approach: it joins the efforts of the Atlas Network and is a founding member of EPICENTER.

Several EPICENTER partners such as the Institute of Economic Affairs and the Lithuanian Free Market Institute are funded by the Tobacco Industry and the IBL is identified as a "Partner" on the website of the transnational tobacco company British American Tobacco Italy.

== Annual Index of Liberalizations ==
IBL publishes an annual Index that aims to shed light on the degree of openness of the 28 Member States by examining ten different economic sectors, which include petrol and diesel retail, electricity, natural gas, labour markets, postal services, telecommunications, broadcasting, air transport, rail transport and insurance. Media and academicians cite the annual index as a source of information for policy-making and research.

First published in 2007, the IBL Index of Liberalizations has greatly evolved over the years. Between 2007 and 2012, Italy was the only country investigated and analyzed against sectoral benchmarks. In 2013, the index methodology was amplified to the EU15, whilst in 2015 the Index began classifying all of the EU28.

== Flat-tax project – VentiCinque% per tutti (TwentyFive% for all) ==
On 26 June 2017, IBL launched a new policy proposal called “Venticinque% per tutti” (Twenty-Five% for all). This ambitious proposal focuses on Italy’s complex tax system. In particular, the Institute suggests a radical fiscal restructuring: a flat, 25% tax rate on the major taxes in Italy’s system (personal income tax, corporation tax, VAT, tax on financial dividends); the repeal of local and regional taxes; and the replacement of the current patchwork of benefits with a universal cash subsidy – a so-called “basic income” subject to several conditions.

The proposal has aroused considerable interest and has been widely debated. Several important politicians, such as Italy’s former Prime Ministers Silvio Berlusconi, Romano Prodi and Lamberto Dini have expressed an interest for IBL’s flat tax reform.

== Bruno Leoni and Sergio Ricossa Lectures ==
Between 2008 and 2016, IBL organized a yearly “Discorso Bruno Leoni” (Bruno Leoni Lecture). Since 2016, this lecture has become a biennial occurrence as in 2017 the so-called “Discorso Sergio Ricossa” replaced it. These two lectures are among the Institute’s flagship events, as they strive to bring the Italian public up-to-date with the most relevant international debates. The “Discorsi” is structured as an in-depth lecture by a distinguished scholar or author, in which a seminal topic is investigated from a free-market, individual liberty perspective.

== Bruno Leoni Award ==
Since 2008, every year the Institute attributes a "Bruno Leoni Award" dedicated to the thinker whose teachings the Institute refers to, and awarded to distinguished personalities. The award is intended for eminent figures that, through a recently published book, or with the work of a lifetime, have helped to advance the ideas of individual freedom, free market and free competition.

== Climate change denial ==
According to scholars the Bruno Leoni Institute is the most prominent Italian neoliberal think tank promoting climate change denial and delay. It has close ties to the American climate change denial movement, is a member of the Cooler Heads Coalition and has used the same narratives as The Heartland Institute, for example that climate change is beneficial.
