= The Death of Economics =

1994 book by Paul Ormerod

- First edition
- Author: Paul Ormerod
- Language: English
- Subject: Economics
- Genre: Non-fiction
- Publisher: Faber & Faber
- Publication date: 1994
- Publication place: United Kingdom
- Media type: Print (Hardcover)
- Pages: 240 pp (first edition)
- ISBN: 978-0312134648
- OCLC: 33132875
- Dewey Decimal: 330 20
- LC Class: HB75 .O76 1995

The Death of Economics is a book written by Paul Ormerod. According to the author the title does not imply that the study of economies is not of great importance but rather it argues that conventional economics offers a misleading view of how the world operates and needs to be replaced.

== Overview ==
The book is split into two parts. The first part contains Ormerod's assessment of the present state of economics; the second part represents a series of suggestions as to how economics can be developed, particularly in relation to unemployment.

Three properties are identified as essential to any model seeking to explain unemployment. First the model should be capable of settling into long periods of regular fluctuations; second, such fluctuations should be sensitive to the initial values of the system; thirdly, following a major shock, there should be no tendency to settle back to the regular behaviour previously seen.

Originally published for the United Kingdom in 1994, Death of Economics has been translated into more than 10 languages.
