= Freedom and the Law =

1961 book by Bruno Leoni

- Author: Bruno Leoni
- Language: Italian, English
- Subject: Politics, Law, Philosophy
- Publication date: 1961
- Publication place: Italy

Freedom and the Law is Italian jurist and philosopher Bruno Leoni's most popular work. It was first published in 1961 and the 3rd edition is now made widely available through the Internet by the Online Library of Liberty , with permission of the George Mason University.

In this book, Leoni contended that the greatest obstacle to the Rule of Law is the problem of overlegislation. Leoni also pointed to a parallelism between the market and common law on the one hand, and socialism and legislation on the other.

Through a review of Roman doctrine and jurisprudence, Leoni shows that the Romans thought of Law as a process of discovery instead as of a set of enacted orders, and that the popular confusion between law and legislation is contemporary to our era and the advent of socialism.

== Table of contents ==
Freedom and the Law
Introduction
Chapter 1.: Which Freedom?
Chapter 2.: "freedom" and "constraint"
Chapter 3.: Freedom and the Rule of Law
Chapter 4.: Freedom and the Certainty of the Law
Chapter 5.: Freedom and Legislation
Chapter 6.: Freedom and Representation
Chapter 7.: Freedom and the Common Will
Chapter 8.: Some Difficulties Analyzed
Conclusion

The Law and Politics
Introduction
Chapter 1.: The Law As Individual Claim
Chapter 2.: Law and Economy In the Making
Chapter 3.: The Economic Approach to the Political
Chapter 4.: Voting Versus the Market

== See also ==
- Philosophy of law
- History of law
