= Living High and Letting Die =

Philosophical book by Peter K. Unger

Living High and Letting Die: Our Illusion of Innocence
- Author: Peter K. Unger
- Genre: Philosophy
- Publication date: 1996

Living High and Letting Die: Our Illusion of Innocence is a philosophy book by Peter K. Unger, published in 1996.

== Overview ==
Inspired by Peter Singer's 1971 essay "Famine, Affluence, and Morality", Unger argues that for people in the developed world to live morally, they are morally obliged to make sacrifices to help mitigate human suffering and premature death in the third world, and further that it is acceptable (and morally right) to lie, cheat, and steal to mitigate suffering.

Unger argues that the intuitive moral judgments most people have of several hypothetical moral scenarios, "The Shallow Pond", "The Vintage Sedan", and "The Envelope", are inconsistent.

Unger presents the hypothetical case of "The Vintage Sedan":

Not truly rich, your one luxury in life is a vintage Mercedes sedan that, with much time, attention, and money, you've restored to mint condition... One day, you stop at the intersection of two small country roads, both lightly traveled. Hearing a voice screaming for help, you get out and see a man who's wounded and covered with a lot of his blood. Assuring you that his wound is confined to one of his legs, the man also informs you that he was a medical student for two full years. And, despite his expulsion for cheating on his second year final exams, which explains his indigent status since, he's knowledgeably tied his shirt near the wound as to stop the flow. So, there's no urgent danger of losing his life, you're informed, but there's great danger of losing his limb. This can be prevented, however, if you drive him to a rural hospital fifty miles away. "How did the wound occur?" you ask. An avid bird-watcher, he admits that he trespassed on a nearby field and, in carelessly leaving, cut himself on rusty barbed wire. Now, if you'd aid this trespasser, you must lay him across your fine back seat. But, then, your fine upholstery will be soaked through with blood, and restoring the car will cost over five thousand dollars. So, you drive away. Picked up the next day by another driver, he survives but loses the wounded leg.

Unger reports that most people respond strongly that abandoning the hitchhiker is abominable behavior, and he contrasts this near-universal harsh judgment with the lenient judgments most people give to "The Envelope":

In your mailbox, there's something from (the U.S. Committee for) UNICEF. After reading it through, you correctly believe that, unless you soon send in a check for $100, then, instead of each living many more years, over thirty more children will die soon.

Unger argues that the factors that distinguish "The Envelope" from "The Vintage Sedan", in which morality compels us to make a sacrifice, are not morally significant, using thought experiments such as variations on the trolley problem to illustrate his point. Unger contends that psychological factors obscure the moral questions, and that our moral intuitions about problems such as these provide an inconsistent window into our true moral values.

Unger conspicuously indicates that the author's royalties from the sales of this book go to UNICEF and to Oxfam America.

== Responses ==
Barry Smith and Berit Brogaard (writing under the pseudonym of Nicola Bourbaki) argue in their article "Living High and Letting Die" that Unger's argument undermines one central approach to the defense of abortion advanced by Judith Jarvis Thomson in her famous violinist thought experiment:

Imagine that your body has become attached, without your permission, to that of a sick violinist. The violinist is a human being. He will die if you detach him. Such detachment seems, nonetheless, to be morally permissible. Thomson argues that an unwantedly pregnant woman is in an analogous situation. Her argument is considered by many to have established the moral permissibility of abortion even under the assumption that the foetus is a human being.

Smith and Brogaard point out that there are some of us

who would be willing to suffer a small but increasing inconvenience for nine months in order to prevent the violinist from dying from his disease. As most of us agree, these people are morally better than the rest of us who are not willing to do so

and they attempt to draw out the more general moral consequences from this observation. Following the strategy adopted by Unger, they point to a number of scenarios in which a woman's right to decide what happens in and to her body seems to be outweighed by the right to life of the violinist.

== See also ==
- Effective altruism
