= Bruno Leoni =

Italian philosopher and lawyer (1913–1967)

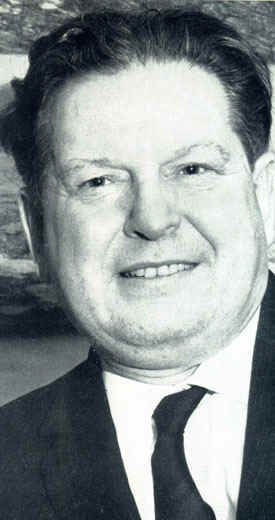
- Born: 26 April 1913; Ancona, Italy
- Died: 21 November 1967 (aged 54); Alpignano, Italy
- Cause of death: Murdered

Education
- Education: University of Pavia

Philosophical work
- Era: 20th-century philosophy
- Region: Western philosophy
- School: Libertarianism
- Institutions: Mont Pelerin Society
- Main interests: Politics, law, economy
- Notable works: Freedom and the Law
- Notable ideas: Public choice, economic analysis of law
- Website: www.brunoleoni.it (foundation)

Bruno Leoni (26 April 1913 – 21 November 1967) was an Italian classical-liberal political philosopher and lawyer. Whilst the war kept Leoni away from teaching, in 1945, he becamea Full professor of Philosophy of Law. Leoni was also appointed Dean of the Department of Political Sciences at the University of Pavia from 1948 to 1960.

== Biography ==
Leoni fought in World War II as part of the “A Force”, an organisation that rescued prisoners of war (POWs) in Italy after 1943.

Leoni was the founder and editor of the political science journal Il Politico. He was also involved as secretary and later president of the Mont Pelerin Society.

Following Richard Posner, Leoni has also been one of the fathers of the Law and Economics school.

In 1967, Leoni was murdered in Alpignano by Osvaldo Quero, a work associate whom Leoni had threatened to report to the authorities after uncovering evidence of fraud. Following an unsuccessful attempt to commit suicide in Rome, Quero was captured by the police and subsequently sentenced to 24 years in prison. He died in 1997.

In 2003, Italian libertarian scholars Carlo Lottieri, Alberto Mingardi and Carlo Stagnaro founded the Bruno Leoni Institute, a free-market think-tank.

== Work ==
Bruno Leoni was a student of Austrian economics, and he applied its core insights to legislation. According to Leoni, just as a central planner lacks the information that emerges in a market, a legislator lacks the information that emerges in case law.

Bruno Leoni’s thought had an impact both on law and economics and on contemporary libertarianism. For Leoni, liberty consists of keeping the lives of people and the resources they command out of the political sphere as much as possible. Thus, the law should filter, rather than facilitate, the tendency toward the full politicisation of human life.

Leoni believes that, in the long run, a system centred on legislation is fundamentally incompatible with the maintenance of a free society. Partly, this is because of the inherent temptations that legislation provides for rent-seekers and other parties seeking to oppress or plunder non-consenting losers in the political process. Partly, it also has to do with the inherent instability of the legislative process and the relative predictability of the common law process, properly understood.

In what is probably his most important work, Freedom and the Law, Leoni makes the observation that for the free market to function effectively, it is necessary for private individuals to have a stable legal framework in which to plan and be confident that their plans will be carried through to fruition. Moreover, for individuals to be free from oppression, it is necessary for the government to announce their rules in advance so that individuals can know what their permitted range of freedom is (what is often, although imprecisely, referred to as the “rule of law”).

Leoni’s thought had a strong impact on important thinkers like James M. Buchanan, Friedrich von Hayek, Murray N. Rothbard and Gordon Tullock.

== Bibliography ==
- Bruno Leoni (1940). Il problema della scienza giuridica, Turin, Giappichelli, pp. 195 (“Memorie dell'Istituto giuridico dell'Università di Torino,” memoria XLV).
- Bruno Leoni (1942). Per una teoria dell'irrazionale nel diritto, Turin, Giappichelli, p. 210 (“Memorie dell'Istituto giuridico dell'Università di Torino,” memoria LI). An abridged version of the first chapter was published in Giusnaturalismo, filosofia del diritto e scienza giuridica, “Bollettino dell'Istituto di Filosofia del Diritto dell'Università di Roma,” n. 2, pp. 47–55.
- Bruno Leoni (1949). Lezioni di filosofia del diritto: vol. I, Il pensiero antico, Pavia, Viscontea, pp. 203 (lithograph).
- Bruno Leoni (1950). Review of F. A. HAYEK, Individualism and Economic Order, in “L'Industria,” n. 1, pp. 145–157.
- Bruno Leoni (1950). Review of L. MISES, Human Action, in “L'Industria,” n. 3, pp. 469–475.
- Bruno Leoni (1953). Il pensiero politico e sociale nell'Ottocento e Novecento, in Questioni di storia contemporanea, edited by E. Rota, vol. II, Milan, Marzorati, pp. 1121–1338. The first chapter of this essay, titled Individualismo, socialismo ed altri concetti politici, was published in “Il Politico,” 1952, n. 2, pp. 145–165.
- Bruno Leoni (1955). Possibilità di applicazione delle matematiche alle discipline economiche (with Eugenio FROLA), in “Il Politico,” n. 2, pp. 190–210; also published in E. FROLA, Scritti metodologici, Introduzione di L. Geymonat, Turin, Giappichelli, 1964, pp. 85–109; English translation On Mathematical Thinking in Economics, “Journal of Libertarian Studies,” vol. 1, No. 2 pp. 101–109, Pergamon Press, 1977.
- Bruno Leoni (1956). Il pensiero cristiano (Appendix to Lezioni di Filosofia del diritto: Il pensiero antico, II ed.), Pavia, Viscontea, pp. 28.
- Bruno Leoni (1957). The Meaning of “Political” in Political Decisions, “Political Studies,” n. 3, pp. 225–239, re-published as an appendix to the third edition of (1961e); Italian translation Natura e significato delle “decisioni politiche,” in “Il Politico,” n. 1, 1957, pp. 3–26.
- Bruno Leoni (1960). Political Decisions and Majority Rule, in “Il Politico,” n. 4, pp. 724–733; trad. it., Decisioni politiche e regola di maggioranza, in “Il Politico,” n. 4 pp. 711–722; re-published as an appendix to the third edition of 1961.
- Bruno Leoni (1961), Freedom and the Law, D. Van Nostrand Company, INC.
- Bruno Leoni (1961). Some Reflections on the “Relativistic” Meaning of Wertfreiheit in the Study of Man, in Relativism and the Study of Man, ed. by H. Schoeck, J.W. Wiggins, Princeton, van Nostrand Company Inc., pp. 158–174; Italian translation Riflessioni sul significato “relativistico” della Wertfreiheit nello studio dell’uomo, in “Il Politico,” 1977, n. 4, pp. 625–638.
- Bruno Leoni (1961). The Economic Approach to the Politics, in “Il Politico,” n. 3 pp. 491–502, re-published as an appendix to the third edition of (1961e); Italian translation L'approccio economistico nello studio delle scelte politiche, in “Il Politico,” n. 3, pp. 477–489.
- Bruno Leoni (1963). A “Neo-Jeffersonian” Theory of the Province of the Judiciary in a Democratic Society, in “UCLA Law Review,” n. 4, pp. 965–984; Italian translation Una teoria “neo-jeffersoniana” della funzione del potere giudiziario in una società democratica, “Il Politico,” 1964, n. 2, pp. 357–375.
- Bruno Leoni (1964). Are Rational Economic Policies Feasible in Western Democratic Countries?, in “Il Politico,” n. 3, pp. 698–701; Italian translation, ibidem, pp. 702–706.
- Bruno Leoni (1964). The Law as Claim of the Individual, in “Archiv für Rechts - und Sozialphilosophie,” pp. 45–58 and reprinted as an appendix to the third English edition of (1961e); Italian translation in (1997a).
- Bruno Leoni (1965). Les hommes libres et le futur de l'économie de marché, in “Il Politico,” n. 4, pp. 852–856.
- Bruno Leoni (1965). (ed.) Mont Pélerin Society. 23 Papers presented at the Fourteenth General Meeting: Semmering, Austria, September 7–12, 1964, Varese, Tipografia Multa Paucis.
- Bruno Leoni (1966). Two Views of Liberty, Occidental and Oriental (?), in “Il Politico,” n. 4, pp. 638–651.
- Bruno Leoni (2008). Law, Liberty and the Competitive Market, edited by Carlo Lottieri, with a preface by Richard A. Epstein, New Brunswick, NJ, Transaction.

== Sources ==
- M.N. Rothbard, On Freedom and the Law, “New Individualist Review”, I, n. 4, 1962
- P.H. Aranson, Bruno Leoni in Retrospect, “Harvard Journal of Law & Public Policy”, XI, n. 3, 1988.
- L. Liggio, and T. Palmer, T. G. (1988) “Freedom and the Law”: A Comment on Professor Aranson's Article, “Harvard Journal of Law & Public Policy”, XI, n. 3, 1988.
- R. Cubeddu, Friedrich A. von Hayek and Bruno Leoni, in “Journal des Economistes ed des Etudes Humaines”, vol. IX, n. 2\3, 1999.
- A. Masala, Il liberalismo di Bruno Leoni, Soveria Mannelli, Rubbettino, 2003.
- E. Baglioni, L' individuo e lo scambio. Teoria ed etica dell'ordine spontaneo nell'individualismo di Bruno Leoni, Napoli, ESI 2004
- A. Masala (ed.) La teoria politica di Bruno Leoni, Soveria Mannelli, Rubbettino, 2005
- C. Lottieri, Le ragioni del diritto. Libertà individuale e ordine giuridico nel pensiero di Bruno Leoni, Soveria Mannelli, Rubbettino, 2006.
- A. Masala, Liberté et droit dans la pensée de Bruno Leoni, in Histoire du Liberalisme en Europe (eds J. Petitot, P. Nemo), Paris, PUF, 2006, pp. 777–794
- A. Favaro, Bruno Leoni. Dell’irrazionalità della legge per la spontaneità dell’ordinamento, Napoli, ESI, 2009.
- A. Gianturco Gulisano, Bruno Leoni tra positivismo e giusnaturalismo. Il diritto evolutivo, "Foedus", N°2, 2009, pp. 87–95
- A. Gianturco Gulisano, La «teoria empirica» di Bruno Leoni. La centralità dell’approccio metodologico, "Biblioteca delle libertá", Anno XLVI, gennaio - aprile 2011 - n. 200, http://www.centroeinaudi.it/images/stories/bdl_online/200online_gianturco_gulisano.pdf
- C. Lottieri, Alle origini del diritto come pretesa individuale. Da Widar Cesarini Sforza a Bruno Leoni, "Materiali per una storia della cultura giuridica", vol. 1, giugno 2011, pp. 63–90.
