= Paul Ormerod =

British economist (born 1950)

Paul Andrew Ormerod (born 20 March 1950) is a British economist who is a partner at Volterra Partners consultancy. Additionally, he is a visiting professor at UCL Centre for Decision Making Uncertainty.

== Research ==
Ormerod's research includes complexity, agent-based modelling, applications of machine learning, the boom-and-bust cycle of businesses and economic competition. He uses a multidisciplinary approach combining biology, physics, mathematics, statistics and psychology.

== Biography ==
Paul Ormerod is a British economist who has worked in a wide variety of fields.

He is a founder of the economics consultancy Volterra Partners LLP, and remains a partner.

Academically, in the 1980s and 1990s he was a visiting professor of economics at Queen Mary, University of London, and the University of Manchester. Paul was a Distinguished Fellow, Institute of Advanced Study, University of Durham, 2007/08 and a visiting professor in the Anthropology Department at Durham 2010–2013. In 2009 he was awarded a DSc honoris causa by the University of Durham "for the distinction of your contribution to the discipline of economics". From 2013 to 2018 he was a visiting professor in the Centre for Decision Making Uncertainty at University College London (UCL), and from 2018 he has been a visiting professor in the computer science department at UCL. In 2006 he was elected a Fellow of the Academy of Social Sciences.

Since 2013, Ormerod has written a weekly column for the newspaper City AM and a selection of his pieces was published in 2018 under the title Against the Grain: Insights from an Economic Contrarian.

In 2020 he was appointed as chair of the Rochdale Development Agency, the economic development arm of Rochdale Metropolitan Borough Council. In the autumn of 2022 he was appointed chair of Atom Valley Greater Manchester Mayoral Development Zone. Atom Valley is the inspiration of Greater Manchester Mayor Andy Burnham, and is an ambitious project to revive the poor boroughs of the north and east of the Greater Manchester city-region by developing a mega-cluster of manufacturing innovation.

Rochdale is Paul's home town and he is President of Rochdale Hornets Rugby League Football Club.

He read economics as an undergraduate at the University of Cambridge, and took the MPhil in economics at the University of Oxford.

== Range of interests ==
Ormerod has worked extensively in the areas of complexity, agent based modelling and the application of machine learning techniques to both macro-economic data and the creation of macro-level emotions from text data. He has published in a very wide range of academic journals with many different collaborators.

== Books and monographs ==
Ormerod has published a number of books and monographs:

- The Death of Economics (1994) St. Martin's Press ISBN 978-0-312-13464-8
- Butterfly Economics: A New General Theory of Economic and Social Behaviour (1998) Faber and Faber, 217 pp. ISBN 0-571-19005-7
- Why Most Things Fail: Evolution, Extinction and Economics (2005) Faber & Faber pp. 225, notes and index. ISBN 0-375-42405-9.
- Crime: Economic Incentives and Social Networks, 2005, Institute of Economic Affairs, London
- Economics, Happiness and Public Policy, 2007, Institute of Economic Affairs, London
- N Squared: Public Policy and the Power of Networks, 2010, Royal Society of Arts, London
- Positive Linking – How Networks Can Revolutionise the World, 2018, Faber and Faber
- Against the Grain: Insights of an Economic Contrarian, 2018, published by the IEA in conjunction with City AM

== See also ==
- Steve Keen
