= Does Moral Philosophy Rest on a Mistake? =

1912 scholarly article by H. A. Prichard

"Does Moral Philosophy Rest on a Mistake?" is an article published by H. A. Prichard in Mind in 1912. It discusses the validity of the question "Why be moral?".

== Content ==
Prichard begins by describing "a vague sense of dissatisfaction with the whole subject" which led to him writing the paper. He finds this dissatisfaction to have its origin in attempts to answer the question "Why be moral?". He argues that such answers reduced to the two following cases:

Either they state that we ought to do so and so, because, as we see when we fully apprehend the facts, doing so will be for our good, i.e. really, as I would rather say, for our advantage, or, better still, for our happiness; or they state that we ought to do so and so, because something realised either in or by the action is good.

Prichard argues that both of these answers miss the mark (though for different reasons). He surveys the answers given by Plato, Aristotle, Joseph Butler, Kant, and his utilitarian peers (such as Hastings Rashdall). In his view, the only reason to what is right is that it is right. Our sense of our duty is "absolutely underivative or immediate", something which "we do not come to appreciate [...] by an argument, i.e. by a process of non-moral thinking". As he was to put it in a later manuscript,

to refer to a certain group of actions as right actions is to imply that we already know that they are right, and therefore, since ‘right’ is after all only a synonym for ‘ought to be done’, that we already know that we ought to do them. Yet to ask ‘why ought we to do them?’ is to imply that we have still to be convinced, and therefore a fortiori do not as yet know that we ought to do them.

It happens that "inevitably the appreciation of the degree to which the execution of these obligations is contrary to our interest raises the doubt whether after all these obligations are "really obligatory, i.e., whether our sense that we ought not to do certain things is not illusion." Thus we demand a "proof" of these obligations. But nothing can provide this proof.

The only remedy lies in actually getting into a situation which occasions the obligation, or—if our imagination be strong enough—in imagining ourselves in that situation, and then letting our moral capacities of thinking do their work. Or, to put the matter generally, if we do doubt whether there is really an obligation to originate A in a situation B, the remedy lies not in any process of general thinking, but in getting face to face with a particular instance of the situation B, and then directly appreciating the obligation to originate A in that situation.

The request for any other remedy is illegitimate. To imagine that there is anything else to say is the mistake on which "Moral Philosophy" is supposed to rest.

== Context ==
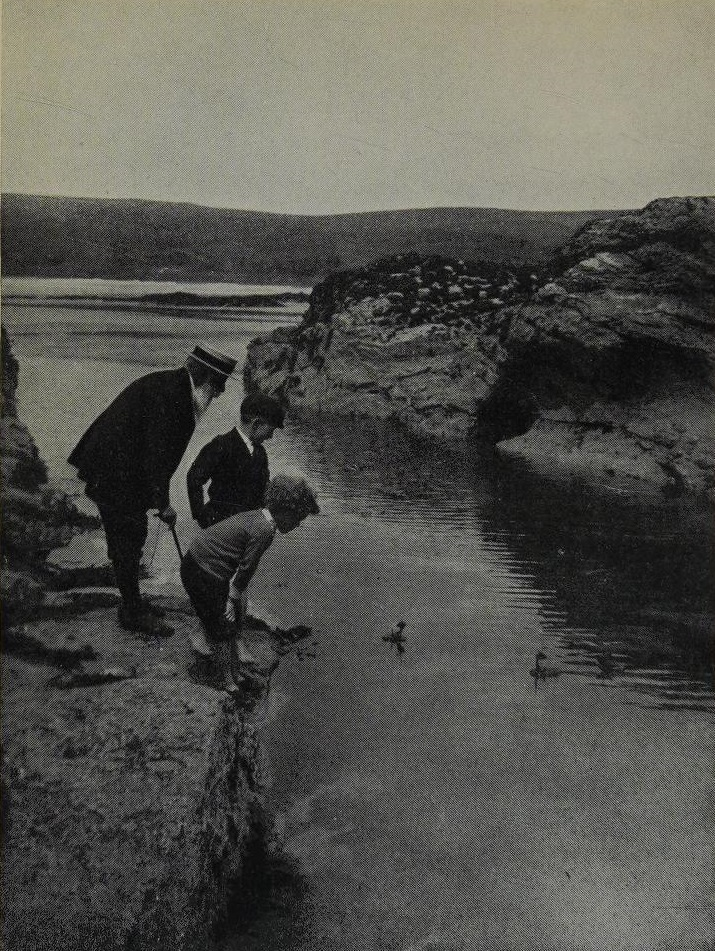
John Cook Wilson playing with Prichard's sons. Cook Wilson, the Wykeham Professor of Logic at Oxford, was an important influence on Prichard's views.

Prichard came up to Oxford in 1890 and was elected an Oxford fellow in 1895; it was at Oxford that he was to spend his entire adult life. The article was the first Prichard published and he published little more. He hoped to write a book about ethics, but it never saw completion. Drafts of it survive in manuscript form, published posthumously in Moral Writings. These drafts cover much of the same ground as "Mistake". At Oxford, Prichard adopted the realist views then represented by John Cook Wilson. Cook Wilson's blunt denials of the possibility of a "Theory of Knowledge" influenced Prichard greatly. Throughout "Mistake", Prichard draws a comparison between the mistake of asking for a proof of our obligations and that of asking for a proof of our knowledge.

According to Thomas Hurka, in "Mistake" Prichard was not reporting a radically new view, but something like the consensus of British moral philosophers at the time. Henry Sidgwick, Edgar Frederick Carritt, G. E. Moore, and A. C. Ewing all basically concurred in their own writings. They believed that there was one basic, unqualified sense of "ought". So the question of why we ought to do what is right (i.e., what we ought to do) puzzled them. The proper questions of moral philosophy were of the content of such obligations. Few, however, went so far as to assert that there was a "mistake" at the heart of so much prior moral philosophy. His defense of Kantian deontology was novel, especially in an Oxford where consequentialism was ascendant.

Indeed, Prichard's view was anticipated two centuries earlier by the Welsh moral philosopher Richard Price in his Review of the Principal Questions in Morals (1758), held in high regard by many of Prichard's contemporaries:

To ask, why are we obliged to practise virtue, to abstain from what is wicked, or perform what is just, is the very same to ask, why we are obliged to do what we are obliged to do? It is not possible to wonder at those, who have so unaccountably embarrassed themselves, on a subject that one would think was attended with no difficulty.

== Legacy ==
Prichard's generation of philosophers were not always held in high regard by their analytic successors at Oxford. Prichard himself intervened to deny both J. L. Austin and A. J. Ayer the 1933 John Locke Prize because their views differed so radically from his own. Ayer referred to the atmosphere of Oxford at the time of Prichard as "surly and unadventurous". He was nonetheless held in high regard personally. Austin was able to praise "the single-mindedness and tautness of his arguments, and the ferocity and the total lack of respect for great names with which Prichard rejected obscurity and lack of inconsistency in philosophy, ancient and modern." Ayer praised Prichard at the same time he disparaged his contemporaries Carritt and W. D. Ross as pale imitations of the man. In spite of their neglect of the period of British moral philosophy between Sidgwick and the Second World War, Prichard's "Mistake" was among the few works of that period (alongside Moore's Principia Ethica and the chapter of Ross's The Right and the Good on prima facie duties) which continued to be read.

Prichard's reading of Aristotle in "Mistake" has not been particularly well received. Prichard described, among his motives, a need to explain "the extreme sense of dissatisfaction produced by a close reading of Aristotle’s Ethics". J. O. Urmson found Prichard's criticisms "surprisingly imperceptive" and could "conclude only that Prichard's dissatisfaction arose from profound misunderstanding", as represented by Prichard's article "The Meaning of ἀγαθόν in the Ethics of Aristotle". In this article, Prichard read Aristotle as meaning by 'good' (ἀγαθόν) "conducive to our happiness", a view which was scathingly criticised by Austin in his "Aγαθόν and Eὐδαιμονία In the Ethics of Aristotle".

"Mistake" also has a legacy as the origin of a snowclone for the titles of academic papers ("Does X Rest on a Mistake?"), especially within philosophy. As Hurka put it, the article simply has "one of the best titles in the history of philosophy".
