= Sense and Sensibilia (Austin book) =

1962 book by J. L. Austin

- Editor: G. J. Warnock
- Author: J. L. Austin
- Language: English
- Subject: Ordinary language philosophy
- Genre: Non-fiction
- Publisher: Oxford University Press
- Publication date: 1962
- Publication place: United Kingdom
- ISBN: 0198245793

Sense and Sensibilia is a landmark 1962 work of ordinary language philosophy by J. L. Austin, Professor of Philosophy at the University of Oxford. Austin attacks sense data theories of perception, specifically those of A. J. Ayer.

The book was published posthumously having been reconstructed from Austin's manuscript notes by fellow Oxford philosopher Geoffrey Warnock. Austin's first lectures, which formed the basis for the manuscript, were delivered at Oxford in Trinity Term 1947 under the general title "Problems in Philosophy".

The Guardian described it as: "... a philosophical classic... Mr Warnock has performed his task in a way that is quite remarkable. His brilliant editing puts everybody who is concerned with philosophical problems in his debt." "Trouser-word" comes from Sense and Sensibilia.
