= Trouser-word =

Linguistic concept

In John Langshaw Austin's philosophy of language and the book Sense and Sensibilia, a trouser-word is a term that is not itself defined in terms of content, but only gains meaning through the contrast to its negation. The negative use "wears the trousers in the relationship."

According to Austin, terms are usually defined by their own criteria. To know what it means that something is X (or is an X), one has to know the criteria for it. Only with this knowledge can one say when something is not X (or not X). With trouser-words, the opposite is true: something is Y if it doesn't meet any of the criteria for not being Y. Typical examples are for Austin real, same, and directly . Only in contrast to e. g. a fake duck, say a toy duck or a picture of a duck, does the predicate real have any meaning in the phrase "a real duck."
