= Toril Moi =

Norwegian academic (born 1953)

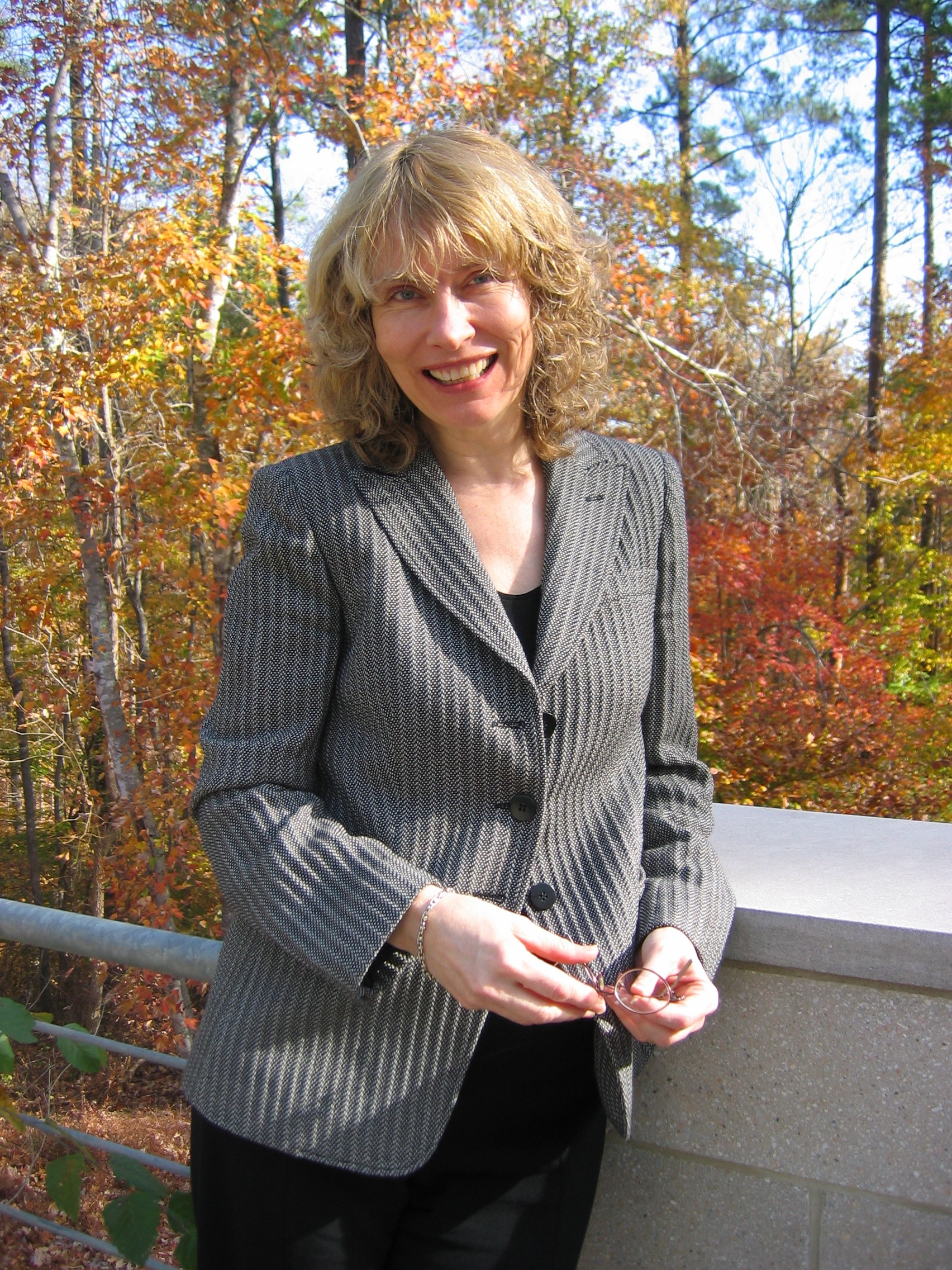
- Toril Moi in 2006
- Born: 28 November 1953 (age 72); Farsund, Vest-Agder, Norway
- Occupations: literary critic, theorist
- Writing career
- Subjects: Feminist literary criticism, culture, theater
- Website: www.torilmoi.com

Toril Moi (born 28 November 1953 in Farsund, Norway) is James B. Duke Professor of Literature and Romance Studies and Professor of English, Philosophy and Theatre Studies at Duke University. Moi is also the Director of the Center for Philosophy, Arts, and Literature at Duke. As an undergraduate, she attended University of Bergen, where she studied in the Literature Department. Previously she held positions as a lecturer in French at the University of Oxford and as Director of the Center for Feminist Research at the University of Bergen, Norway. She lived in Oxford, United Kingdom from 1979 to 1989. Moi lives in North Carolina. She works on feminist theory and women's writing; on the intersections of literature, philosophy and aesthetics; and is fundamentally concerned with "finding ways of reading literature with philosophy and philosophy with literature without reducing the one to the other."

In 2002, she was awarded an honorary degree, doctor philos. honoris causa, at the Norwegian University of Science and Technology. In 1998, she won Duke's University Teacher of the Year Award and in 2008 she won the Dean's Award for Excellence in Mentoring of Graduate Students. In 2014 she gave the British Academy's Master-Mind Lecture.

She is a member of the Norwegian Academy of Science and Letters. In 2026, she was elected to the American Philosophical Society.

== On feminist theories ==
Moi made her name with Sexual/Textual Politics (1986), a survey of second-wave feminism in which she contrasted the more empirical Anglo-American school of writings, such as gynocriticism, with the more theoretical French proponents of Ecriture feminine. While widely perceived at the time as an attack on the Anglo-American approach, Moi would later highlight her respect for their more politicized stance, as opposed to the idealism of the post-structuralists. The book would also explore the concept of androgyny, along with its links to the anti-essentialism of the French school.

Sexual/Textual Politics was followed by further explorations of contemporary French feminists such as Julia Kristeva, before Moi turned to her ground-breaking 1994 study of Simone de Beauvoir. Over the following decade, however, her focus of attention shifted to ordinary language philosophy from existentialism. Her most recent book, Revolution of the Ordinary: Literary Studies after Wittgenstein, Austin, and Cavell (2017), articulates an ordinary language philosophy-inspired approach to the task of literary criticism. The book has been praised by critics such as Rita Felski, R.M. Berry, Robert Pippin, and John Gibson. Writing in the Los Angeles Review of Books, V. Joshua Adams claims that Moi's book "makes a case for rejecting the approach to language that the 'theory project' produced," and that "beyond challenging the ways that literary studies thinks about language, Moi challenges the distinction between literature and life." Revolution of the Ordinary also makes important interventions in the field of postcritique.

== Publications ==
- Moi, Revolution of the Ordinary: Literary Studies after Wittgenstein, Austin, and Cavell (2017)
- ___, Sexual/Textual Politics: Feminist Literary Theory (1985; 2nd edition 2002)
- ___, Simone de Beauvoir: The Making of an Intellectual Woman (1994)
- ___, What Is a Woman? And Other Essays (1999)
- ___, Henrik Ibsen and the Birth of Modernism: Art, Theater, Philosophy (Oxford University Press 2006). [A Norwegian translation was published by Pax Forlag (Oslo) in May 2006)
- Moi ed., The Kristeva Reader (1986)
- ___ ed., French Feminist Thought (1987)

== See also ==
- Nancy Bauer (philosopher)
- Judith Butler
- Alice Crary
- Peggy Kamuf
- Gayatri Spivak
