= Stanley Cavell =

American philosopher (1926–2018)

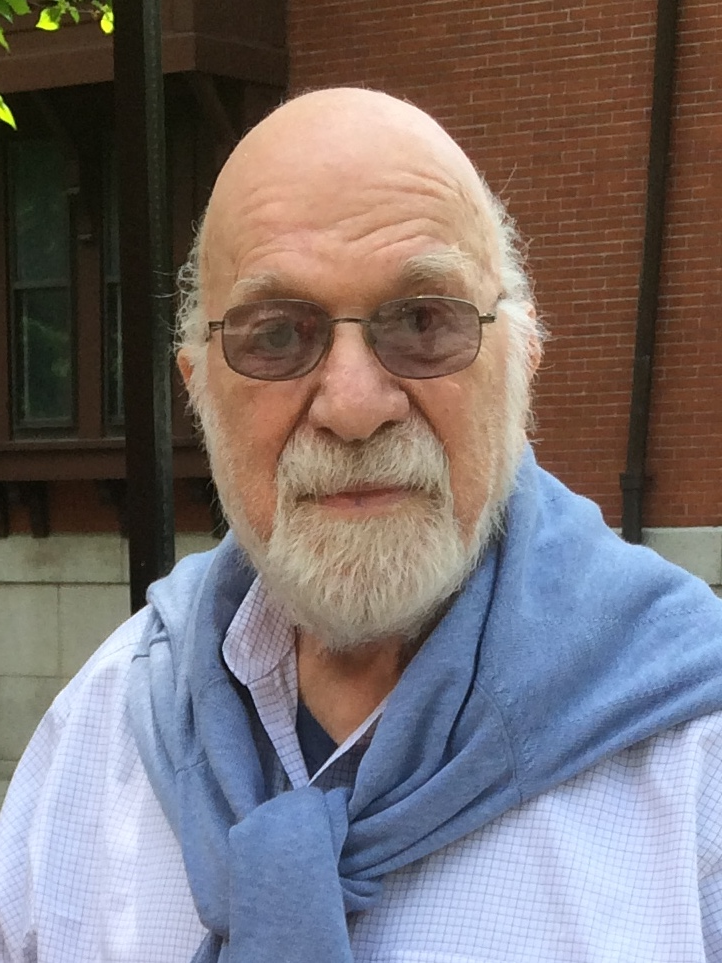
- Cavell in 2016
- Born: Stanley Louis Goldstein; September 1, 1926; Atlanta, Georgia, U.S.
- Died: June 19, 2018 (aged 91); Boston, Massachusetts, U.S.

Education
- Education: University of California, Berkeley (BA); University of California, Los Angeles; Harvard University (PhD)
- Doctoral advisors: Roderick Firth; John Ladd; Morton White
- Other advisors: Henry David Aiken; J. L. Austin; Abraham Kaplan

Philosophical work
- School: Postanalytic philosophy
- Institutions: Harvard University
- Doctoral students: Nancy Bauer; Ted Cohen; James F. Conant; Arnold Davidson; Paul W. Franks; Paul Guyer; Barbara Herman; David Macarthur; Susan Neiman
- Notable students: Alice Crary
- Main interests: Skepticism, tragedy, aesthetics, ethics, ordinary language philosophy, American transcendentalism, film theory, William Shakespeare, opera, religion
- Notable ideas: Linguistic film theory, moral perfectionism

Stanley Louis Cavell (/kəˈvɛl/; September 1, 1926 – June 19, 2018) was an American philosopher. He was the Walter M. Cabot Professor of Aesthetics and the General Theory of Value at Harvard University. He worked in the fields of ethics, aesthetics, and ordinary language philosophy. As an interpreter, he produced influential works on Wittgenstein, Austin, Emerson, Thoreau, and Heidegger. His work is characterized by its conversational tone and frequent literary references.

== Life ==
Cavell was born as Stanley Louis Goldstein to a Jewish family in Atlanta, Georgia. His mother, Fannie (Segal), the daughter of immigrants from Romania, was a locally renowned pianist for radio, vaudeville, and silent films. She trained him in music from his earliest days. During the Great Depression, Cavell's parents moved several times between Atlanta and Sacramento, California. As an adolescent, Cavell played lead alto saxophone as the youngest member of a black jazz band in Sacramento. Around this time he changed his name, anglicizing his father's original Polish name, Kavelieruskii (sometimes spelled "Kavelieriskii"). He entered the University of California, Berkeley, where, along with his lifelong friend Bob Thompson, he majored in music, studying with, among others, Roger Sessions and Ernest Bloch. After graduation, he studied composition at the Juilliard School of Music in New York City, only to discover that music was not his calling.

He entered graduate school in philosophy at UCLA and then transferred to Harvard University. As a student there he came under the influence of J. L. Austin, whose teaching and methods "knocked him off ... [his] horse." In 1954 he was awarded a Junior Fellowship at the Harvard Society of Fellows. Before completing his Ph.D., he became an Assistant Professor of Philosophy at the University of California, Berkeley, in 1956. Cavell's daughter by his first wife (Marcia Cavell), Rachel Lee Cavell, was born in 1957. In 1962–63 Cavell was a Fellow at the Institute for Advanced Study in Princeton, New Jersey, where he befriended the British philosopher Bernard Williams. Cavell’s marriage to Marcia ended in divorce in 1961. In 1963 he returned to the Harvard Philosophy Department, where he became the Walter M. Cabot Professor of Aesthetics and the General Theory of Value.

In the summer of 1964, Cavell joined a group of graduate students, who taught at Tougaloo College, a historically black Protestant college in Mississippi, as part of what became known as the Freedom Summer. He and Cathleen (Cohen) Cavell were married in 1967. In April 1969, during the student protests (chiefly arising from the Vietnam War), Cavell, helped by his colleague John Rawls, worked with a group of African-American students to draft language for a faculty vote to establish Harvard's Department of African and African-American Studies.

In 1976, Cavell's first son, Benjamin, was born. In 1979, along with the documentary filmmaker Robert H. Gardner, Cavell helped found the Harvard Film Archive, to preserve and present the history of film. Cavell received a MacArthur Fellowship in 1992. In 1996-97 Cavell was president of the American Philosophical Association (Eastern Division). In 1984, his second son, David, was born. Cavell remained on the Harvard faculty until retiring in 1997. Thereafter, he taught courses at Yale University and the University of Chicago. He also held the Spinoza Chair of Philosophy at the University of Amsterdam in 1998.

Cavell died in Boston, Massachusetts of heart failure on June 19, 2018, at the age of 91. He was buried at Mount Auburn Cemetery.

== Philosophy ==
Although trained in the Anglo-American analytic tradition, Cavell frequently interacted with the continental tradition. He includes film and literary study in philosophical inquiry. Cavell wrote extensively on Ludwig Wittgenstein, J. L. Austin, and Martin Heidegger, as well as the American transcendentalists Henry Thoreau and Ralph Waldo Emerson. His work was for a time frequently compared to that of Jacques Derrida, whom he met in 1970. Although their exchange was congenial, Cavell denied the full extent to which deconstruction could undermine the possibility of meaning, instead taking an explicitly ordinary language approach to language and skepticism. He writes about Wittgenstein in a fashion known as the New Wittgenstein, which according to Alice Crary interprets Wittgenstein as putting forward a positive view of philosophy as a therapeutic form. Cavell's work incorporates autobiographical elements concerning how his movement between and within these thinkers' ideas influenced his views in the arts and humanities, beyond the technical study of philosophy.

Cavell established his distinct philosophical identity with Must We Mean What We Say? (1969), a collection of essays that addresses topics such as language use, metaphor, skepticism, tragedy, and literary interpretation from the point of view of ordinary language philosophy, of which he is a practitioner and ardent defender. One of the essays discusses Søren Kierkegaard's work on revelation and authority, The Book on Adler, in an effort to help reintroduce the book to modern philosophical readers. In The World Viewed (1971) Cavell looks at photography, film, modernism in art and the nature of media, mentioning the influence of art critic Michael Fried on his work.

Cavell is well-known for The Claim of Reason: Wittgenstein, Skepticism, Morality, and Tragedy (1979), which forms the centerpiece of his work and has its origins in his doctoral dissertation. In Pursuits of Happiness (1981), Cavell describes his experience of seven prominent Hollywood comedies: The Lady Eve, It Happened One Night, Bringing Up Baby, The Philadelphia Story, His Girl Friday, Adam’s Rib, and The Awful Truth. Cavell argues that these films, from 1934–1949, form part of what he calls the genre of "The Comedy of Remarriage," and finds in them great philosophical, moral, and political significance. Specifically, Cavell argues that these comedies show that "the achievement of happiness requires not the [...] satisfaction of our needs [...] but the examination and transformation of those needs." According to Cavell, the emphasis these movies place on remarriage draws attention to the fact that, within a relationship, happiness requires "growing up" together with one's partner.

In Cities of Words (2004) Cavell traces the history of moral perfectionism, a mode of moral thinking spanning the history of Western philosophy and literature. Having used Emerson to outline the concept, the book suggests ways we might want to understand philosophy, literature, and film as preoccupied with features of perfectionism. In Philosophy the Day After Tomorrow (2005), a collection of essays, Cavell makes the case that J. L. Austin's concept of performative utterance requires the supplementary concept of passionate utterance: "A performative utterance is an offer of participation in the order of law. And perhaps we can say: A passionate utterance is an invitation to improvisation in the disorders of desire." The book also contains extended discussions of Friedrich Nietzsche, Jane Austen, George Eliot, Henry James, and Fred Astaire, as well as familiar Cavellian subjects such as Shakespeare, Emerson, Thoreau, Wittgenstein, and Heidegger. Cavell's final book published during his lifetime, Little Did I Know: Excerpts from Memory (2010), is an autobiography written in the form of a diary. In a series of consecutive, dated entries, he inquires about the origins of his philosophy by telling the story of his life.

A scholarly journal, Conversations: The Journal of Cavellian Studies, engages with his philosophical work. It is edited by Sérgio Dias Branco and Amir Khan and published by the University of Ottawa.

== Honorary degrees ==
- Doctor of Humane Letters, Kalamazoo College, 1980
- Doctor of Letters, Iona College, 1985
- Doctor of Humane Letters, University of Chicago, 1987
- Docteur, Honoris Causa, Université de Strasbourg, 1996
- Doctor Philosophiae Honoris Causa, Hebrew University, 1997
- Doctor of Letters, Honoris Causa, University of East Anglia, 2009
- Docteur, Honoris Causa, École normale supérieure de Lyon, 2010
- Doctor of Letters, Wesleyan University, 2010
- Doctor of Theology, Institut protestant de théologie de Paris, 2010

== Selected honors ==
- Junior Fellow, Society of Fellows, Harvard University, 1953–56
- Fellow, Institute for Advanced Study, Princeton, New Jersey, 1962–1963
- Distinguished Teaching Award, University of California, Berkeley, 1961
- Fellow, Wesleyan University Center for the Humanities, 1970–1971
- Fellow, American Academy of Arts and Sciences, 1978–
- Fellow, MacArthur Foundation
- President, American Philosophical Association (Eastern Division), 1996–97
- 2000 Centennial Medalist, Harvard University Graduate School of Arts and Sciences
- Romanell Phi Beta Kappa Professorship, 2004–05
- Member, American Philosophical Society, 2005-

== Selected special lectureships ==
- Patricia Wise Lecture, American Film Institute, 1982
- Mrs. William Beckman Lectures, University of California, Berkeley, 1983
- Tanner Lecture, Stanford University, April 1986
- Carus Lectures, American Philosophical Association, 1988
- Plenary Address, Shakespeare World Congress, Los Angeles, 1996
- Presidential Address, American Philosophical Association, Atlanta, 1996
- Howison Lectures, University of California, Berkeley, February, 2002

== Works ==
- Must we mean what we say? : a book of essays. Cambridge University Press. 1976 [1969]. ISBN 978-0-521-21116-1.
- The World Viewed: Reflections on the Ontology of Film (1971); 2nd enlarged edition (1979)
- The Senses of Walden (1972) Expanded edition San Francisco: North Point Press, 1981.
- The Claim of Reason: Wittgenstein, Skepticism, Morality, and Tragedy (1979) New York: Oxford University Press.
- Pursuits of Happiness: The Hollywood Comedy of Remarriage (1981) ISBN 978-0-674-73906-2
- Themes Out of School: Effects and Causes (1984)
- Disowning Knowledge: In Six Plays of Shakespeare (1987); 2nd edition: Disowning Knowledge: In Seven Plays of Shakespeare (2003)
- In Quest of the Ordinary: Lines of Scepticism and Romanticism (1988) Chicago: Chicago University Press.
- This New Yet Unapproachable America: Lectures after Emerson after Wittgenstein (1988)
- Conditions Handsome and Unhandsome: The Constitution of Emersonian Perfectionism (1990)
- A Pitch of Philosophy: Autobiographical Exercises (1994)
- Philosophical Passages: Wittgenstein, Emerson, Austin, Derrida (1995)
- Contesting Tears: The Melodrama of the Unknown Woman (1996)
- Emerson's Transcendental Etudes (2003)
- Cavell on Film (2005)
- Cities of Words: Pedagogical Letters on a Register of the Moral Life (2004)
- Philosophy the Day after Tomorrow (2005)
- Little Did I Know: Excerpts from Memory (2010)
- Here and There: Sites of Philosophy (2022)
- "Walden in Tokyo". Journal of Philosophy of Education. 59 (5–6): 825–834. 2026-01-02. doi:10.1093/jopedu/qhaf084. ISSN 0309-8249.

== See also ==
- List of American philosophers
