= John Cook Wilson =

English philosopher (1849–1915)

John Cook Wilson FBA
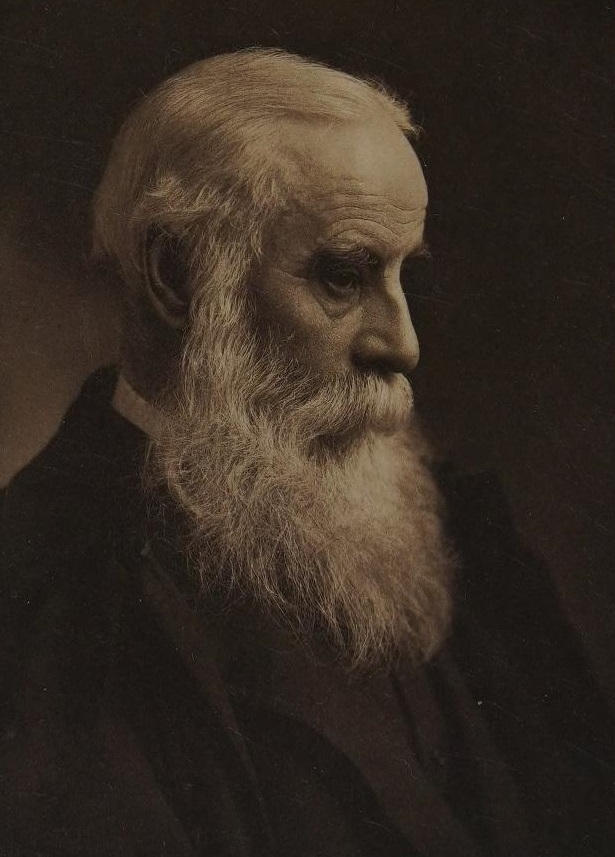
- Born: 6 June 1849; Nottingham, England
- Died: 11 August 1915 (aged 66); Oxford, England
- Spouse: Charlotte Schneider (m. 1876)

Education
- Education: Balliol College, Oxford; University of Göttingen
- Academic advisors: Henry William Chandler; T. H. Green; Hermann Lotze; H. J. S. Smith

Philosophical work
- Era: 19th-/20th-century philosophy
- Region: Western philosophy
- School: Direct realism
- Institutions: University of Oxford
- Notable students: E. F. Carritt; R. G. Collingwood; A. S. L. Farquharson; H. W. B. Joseph; H. A. Prichard; W. D. Ross
- Main interests: Logic, epistemology
- Notable ideas: Knowledge as undefinable

John Cook Wilson (6 June 1849 – 11 August 1915) was an English philosopher, Wykeham Professor of Logic and Fellow of New College.

== Early life and career ==
John Cook Wilson was born in Nottingham, England, in 1849. He was the son of James Wilson, a Methodist minister, and Hannah Cook. After studying at Derby Grammar School, 1862–67, Cook Wilson went up with a scholarship to Balliol College in 1868, where he read both Classics under H. W. Chandler and Mathematics under H. J. S. Smith. He graduated with a double 'double-first', gaining both firsts in Mathematical (1869) and Classical Moderations (1870), and then firsts in Mathematics (1871) and Literae Humaniores or 'Greats' (1872). He received the Conington Prize in 1882. He studied logic under Hermann Lotze at the University of Göttingen.

Cook Wilson became a Fellow of Oriel College, Oxford in 1873, and he was elected Wykeham Professor of Logic in 1889, eventually becoming a Fellow of New College in 1901 and remaining there until his death.

The bulk of Cook Wilson's publications were in classics and mathematics.

== Classics ==
In classics, Cook Wilson published over 50 papers and book-length studies on Aristotle's Nicomachean Ethics and on Plato's Timaeus.

== Philosophy ==
Cook Wilson believed that "the (printed) letter killeth, and it is extraordinary how it will prevent the acutest from exercising their wonted clearness of vision" (Statement and Inference, p. 872), and so naturally refrained from publishing his philosophical views, printing instead for private circulation pamphlets known as Dictata, from which his student A. S. L. Farquharson assembled, along with some letters, the volumes of Statement and Inference after his death.

Belonging to a generation brought up in the atmosphere of British idealism, he espoused the cause of direct realism. His posthumous collected papers, Statement and Inference (a defence of direct realism), were influential on a generation of Oxford philosophers, including H. H. Price and Gilbert Ryle. He also features prominently in the work of J. L. Austin, John McDowell, and Timothy Williamson. P. F. Strawson's expression, "the attributive tie", in Individuals (1959, 168) is named "in memory of Cook Wilson".

Cook Wilson often argued for the existence of God as an experiential reality. He is quoted saying "We don't want merely inferred friends, could we be satisfied with an inferred God?". He also had a long running dispute with Lewis Carroll over the barbershop paradox.

== Personal life ==
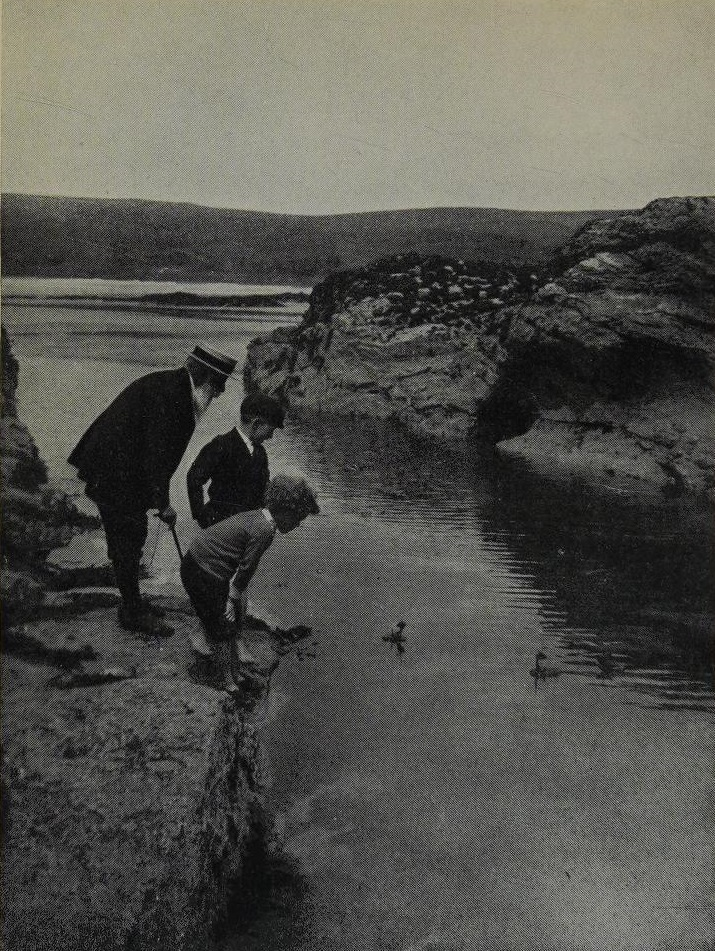
Cook Wilson playing with H. A. Prichard's sons.

Cook Wilson's most important extra-curricular activity was the development of tactics for military bicycle units to which he also devoted some publications and the Army Cyclist Corps which was formed at his suggestion. He married Charlotte Schneider, whom he had met in Germany, in 1876, but she had predeceased him in January 1914. They had a son, Ralph Woempener Wilson, also a scholar at Balliol (1898–1902) who later moved to South Africa. Cook Wilson died at his home in North Oxford on 11 August 1915, from pernicious anemia.

== Writings ==
- Aristotelian Studies I. On the Structure of the Seventh Book of the Nicomachean Ethics, ch. i–x, Oxford: Clarendon Press, 1871, second edition, 1912.
- On the Interpretation of Plato's Timaeus. Critical Studies with Reference to a Recent Edition, Oxford: Clarendon Press, 1889.
- On an Evolutionist Theory of the Axioms, An Inaugural Lecture, Oxford: Clarendon Press, 1889.
- 'Inverse or "a posteriori" Probability', Nature, 13 December 1900, pp. 154–6.
- 'Probability—James Bernoulli's Theorem', Nature, 14 March 1901, pp. 465–6.
- 'On the Geometrical Problem in Plato's Meno, 86e sqq.: With a Note on a Passage in the Treatise De Lineis Insecabilibus', The Journal of Philology, 1 January 1903, pp. 222–240.
- 'On the Platonist Doctrine of the ἀσύμβλητοι ἀριθμοί', The Classical Review, vol. 18 (1904), pp. 247–60.
- 'Lewis Carroll's Logical Paradox', Mind, vol.14 (1905), pp. 292–293. With correction, Mind, vol. 14 (1905), p. 439.
- Statement and Inference and other Philosophical Papers, ed. A. S. L. Farquharson, Oxford: Clarendon Press, 1926; new edition, Bristol: Thoemmes Continuum, 2002.

A full list of Cook Wilson's publications can be found in Statement and Inference, ed. A.S.L. Farquharson, Oxford: Clarendon Press, 1926, pp. lxvi–lxxii.
