= J. L. Austin =

English philosopher (1911–1960)

J. L. Austin OBE FBA
- Austin (1951) by Ramsey and Muspratt
- Born: John Langshaw Austin; 26 March 1911; Lancaster, England
- Died: 8 February 1960 (aged 48); Oxford, England

Education
- Education: Balliol College, Oxford
- Academic advisors: H. H. Joachim; H. A. Prichard

Philosophical work
- Era: 20th-century philosophy
- Region: Western philosophy
- School: Analytic; Ordinary language philosophy Correspondence theory of truth
- Institutions: Magdalen College, Oxford; Harvard University; UC Berkeley
- Doctoral students: John Searle
- Notable students: Jonathan Bennett; Stanley Cavell; Thomas Nagel; Richard Swinburne
- Main interests: Philosophy of language, philosophy of mind, ethics, philosophy of perception
- Notable ideas: Speech acts, performative utterance, descriptive fallacy, linguistic phenomenology

John Langshaw Austin (26 March 1911 – 8 February 1960) was an English philosopher of language and leading proponent of ordinary language philosophy, best known for developing the theory of speech acts.

Austin pointed out that we use language to do things as well as to assert things, and that the utterance of a statement like "I promise to do so-and-so" is best understood as doing something—here, making a promise—rather than making an assertion about anything; hence the title of one of his best-known works, How to Do Things with Words (1955).

Austin, in formulating this theory of speech acts, mounts a significant challenge to the philosophy of language, far beyond merely elucidating a class of morphological sentence forms that function to do what they name.

Austin's work ultimately suggests that all speech and all utterance is the doing of something with words and signs, challenging a metaphysics of language that would posit denotative, propositional assertion as the essence of language and meaning.

== Life ==
Austin was born in Lancaster, Lancashire, England, the second son of Geoffrey Langshaw Austin (1884–1971), an architect, and Mary Hutton Bowes-Wilson (1883–1948; née Wilson). In 1921 the family moved to Scotland, where Austin's father became the secretary of St Leonards School, St Andrews. Austin was educated at Shrewsbury School in 1924, earning a scholarship in Classics, and went on to study classics at Balliol College, Oxford, in 1929.

In 1930 Austin received a First in Classical Moderations (Greek and Latin) and in the following year won the Gaisford Prize for Greek prose. In finals in 1933 he received a first in Literae Humaniores (Philosophy and Ancient History). Literae Humaniores introduced Austin to serious philosophy and gave him a lifelong interest in Aristotle. Austin won a prize fellowship at All Souls College, Oxford, that year, but aside from being friends with Isaiah Berlin, he did not like its lack of structure, and undertook his first teaching position in 1935, as fellow and tutor at Magdalen College, Oxford.

Austin's early interests included Aristotle, Kant, Leibniz, and Plato (particularly the Theaetetus). His contemporary influences included G. E. Moore, John Cook Wilson and H. A. Prichard. These contemporary philosophers shaped their views about general philosophical questions on the basis of careful attention to the more specific judgements we make, as they took our specific judgements to be relatively more secure than our general judgements. According to Guy Longworth, writing in The Stanford Encyclopedia of Philosophy: "It's plausible that some aspects of Austin's distinctive approach to philosophical questions derived from his engagement with [Moore, Wilson, and Prichard]."

During World War II, Austin joined the military—in July 1940—and married his student Jean Coutts (in the spring of 1941). Austin served in the British Intelligence Corps, and was responsible for as many as 500 analysts. Known as "the Martians", the group's preparation for D-Day helped keep Allied casualties much lower than expected. Austin left the army with the rank of lieutenant colonel and was honoured for his intelligence work with an OBE (Officer of the Order of the British Empire), the French Croix de Guerre, and the U.S. Officer of the Legion of Merit.

After the war Austin became White's Professor of Moral Philosophy at Oxford, as a Professorial Fellow of Corpus Christi College. Publishing little, his influence would largely make itself felt through his teaching in lectures and tutorials and, especially, his famous 'Saturday morning meetings'.

Austin visited Harvard and Berkeley in the mid-fifties, in 1955 delivering the William James Lectures at Harvard that would become How to Do Things with Words, and offering a seminar on excuses whose material would find its way into "A Plea for Excuses". It was at this time that he met and befriended Noam Chomsky. He was president of the Aristotelian Society from 1956 to 1957. In 1950 he published an English language translation of Gottlob Frege's Die Grundlagen der Arithmetik.

Before he could decide whether to accept an offer to move to Berkeley, Austin died on 8 February 1960 at the age of 48, shortly after being diagnosed with lung cancer. His wealth, after probate, was £15,049 0s. 5d. (equivalent to £302,000 in 2025). At the time of his death, he was developing a semantic theory based on sound symbolism, using the English gl-words as data.

== Work ==
=== How to Do Things with Words ===
How to Do Things with Words (1955/1962) is perhaps Austin's most influential work. This work is based on a series of lectures that Austin delivered at Oxford University (1951–1954) and then at Harvard University (1955). A version of these lectures was published as a book. In contrast to the positivist view, he argues, sentences with truth-values form only a small part of the range of utterances.

After introducing several kinds of sentences which he asserts are neither true nor false, he turns in particular to one of these kinds of sentences, which he calls performative utterances or just "performatives". These he characterises by two features:

- First, performative sentences—though they may take the form of a typical indicative sentence—are not used to describe (or "constate"), and are thus neither true nor false; i.e., they have no truth-value.
- Second, to utter one of these sentences in appropriate circumstances is not just to say something, but rather to thereby perform a certain kind of action (i.e., beyond and in addition to that of speaking alone).

When something goes wrong in connection with a performative utterance it is—in Austin's words—infelicitous or unhappy, rather than false. (Note: Austin seems to have thought, controversially, that a performative utterance must be infelicitous if it occurs in a poem. Robert Maximilian de Gaynesford has argued that what Austin intends by his comments on poetry is better than is usually thought, but what he offers poets is considerably worse; see his "The Seriousness of Poetry", Essays in Criticism 59, 2009, pp. 1-21.)

The action that is performed when a "performative utterance" is issued belongs to what Austin later calls a speech-act. More particularly, the kind of action Austin has in mind is what he subsequently terms the illocutionary act. For example, if you say "I name this ship the Queen Elizabeth", and the circumstances are appropriate in certain ways, then you will have done something special: namely, you will have thus christened the ship. Other examples include "I take this man as my lawfully wedded husband" (used in the course of a marriage ceremony), or "I bequeath this watch to my brother" (as occurring in a will). In all three cases the sentence is not being used to describe or state what one is doing, but being used to actually do it.

After numerous attempts to find more characteristics of performatives, and after having met with many difficulties, Austin makes what he calls a "fresh start", in which he considers "more generally the senses in which to say something may be to do something, or in saying something we do something".

For example: John Smith turns to Sue Snub and asks "Is Jeff's shirt red?", to which Sue replies "Yes". John has undertaken a series of bodily movements which result in the production of a certain sound; Austin calls such a performance a phonetic act, and the resulting "certain sound" a phone. John's utterance also conforms to the lexical and grammatical conventions of English—that is, John has produced an English sentence; Austin calls this a phatic act, and labels such utterances phemes. John also referred to Jeff's shirt, and to the colour red. To use a pheme with a more or less definite sense and reference is to utter a rheme, and to perform a rhetic act. Note that rhemes are a sub-class of phemes, which in turn are a sub-class of phones. One cannot perform a rheme without also performing a pheme and a phone. The performance of these three acts is the performance of a locution—it is the act of saying something.

John has therefore performed a locutionary act. He has also done at least two other things: he has asked a question of, and elicited an answer from, Sue; in so doing, he has performed two further speech-acts, as Austin would have it:

1. Asking a question is an example of the illocutionary act. To perform an illocutionary act is to use a locution with a certain force; that is, in contrast to a locution—the act of saying something—an illocutionary act is an act performed in saying something. Other examples would be making an assertion, giving an order, and promising to do something.
2. Eliciting an answer is an example of what Austin calls a perlocutionary act: an act performed by the saying of something. Whereas illocutions and locutions are alternative descriptions of the utterance itself, perlocutions are classifiable by the further effects of an utterance. Other examples would be a heeded warning, or a successful attempt at persuasion.

Notice that if one successfully performs a perlocution, one also succeeds in performing both an illocution and a locution.

In the theory of speech acts, attention has especially focused on the illocutionary act; much less on the locutionary and perlocutionary act; and only rarely on the subdivision of the locution into phone, pheme and rheme.

=== Performative utterance ===
According to Austin, a "performative utterance" refers to the action of "performing" or "doing" a certain action; for example, when people say "I promise to do so and so", they are generating the action of making a promise by so speaking. If this is accomplished without any flaw (in this case: if the promise is fulfilled), the performative utterance is "happy" or "felicitous"; if, on the other hand, one fails to do as promised, it is "unhappy", or "infelicitous". Notice that performative utterance is not truth-valuable; i.e., the judgements "true" and "false" do not apply.

Austin variously opposes different categories of utterance in order to analyze the differences, or lack thereof, between them: explicit vs. implicit or inexplicit performatives; explicit performatives vs. primitive or primary utterances or performatives; and pure performatives vs. half-descriptive vs. descriptive utterances.

In How to Do Things With Words (edited by J. O. Urmson and Marina Sbisà), which records Austin's lectures on this topic, examples are offered for each of these distinctions:

- For explicit or pure performatives, Austin gives the example of "I apologize"—the saying of which explicitly performs the speech-act, such that it would be nonsensical for someone to ask: "Does he or she really?" (Note: Note that this is not to ask whether or not the speaker is sincere; rather, the idea is that there is no question as to whether an apology or criticism has really been offered—sincere or otherwise, it has explicitly been tendered. (See: pp. 83-4))
- As an example of a half-descriptive utterance, Austin gives the phrase "I am sorry": there is some uncertainty as to whether the speaker is thereby offering an apology, or merely stating a fact; it could be either, absent clarifying context.
- An entirely descriptive utterance might be a statement such as "I repent": here we have speech merely reporting upon our interlocutor's feeling (rather than itself enacting repentance by so being spoken).
- Implicit performatives are those wherein the performance of an action is implied, but not expressly established; an example Austin uses is the phrase "I shall be there": one may ask, in this case, if the speaker is promising to be there, stating an intention, or reporting a prediction. (Note: Compare: "I promise that I shall be there"—the implicit performance (of a promise) in the I shall... portion of the utterance is made explicit by the I promise that... which precedes it; without this latter, however, it may not be a performative utterance at all. (See: pp. 69-71))
- A primary performative admits of some ambiguity in interpretation: these may be taken to be either implicit performatives, or else entirely non-performative (sometimes constative, in Austin's parlance) utterances. A similar situation obtains with a statement such as "there is a bull in that field", which Austin gives as an illustration of a primitive utterance—does the speaker mean to warn us of the bull and thereby keep us out of the field, or is it merely an observation? (Note: "[...] Here we have primitive as distinct from explicit performatives; and there may be nothing in the circumstances by which we can decide whether or not the utterance is performative at all." (See: p. 33))

Most examples given in the book are of explicit performatives, because they are easy to identify and observe; identifying other performatives requires comparison and contrast with explicit performatives.

=== Sense and Sensibilia ===
In the posthumously published Sense and Sensibilia (the title is Austin's own, and echoes the title of Sense and Sensibility, Jane Austen's first book, just as his name echoes hers), Austin criticizes the claims put forward by A. J. Ayer's The Foundations of Empirical Knowledge (1940), and to a lesser extent, H. H. Price's Perception (1932) and G. J. Warnock's Berkeley (1953), concerning the sense-data theory. He states that perceptual variation, which can be attributed to physical causes, does not involve a figurative disconnection between sense and reference, due to an unreasonable separation of parts from the perceived object. Central to his argument, he shows that "there is no one kind of thing that we 'perceive' but many different kinds, the number being reducible if at all by scientific investigation and not by philosophy" (Austin 1962a, 4).

Austin argues that Ayer fails to understand the proper function of such words as "illusion", "delusion", "hallucination", "looks", "appears" and "seems", and uses them instead in a "special way...invented by philosophers". According to Austin, normally these words allow us to express reservations about our commitment to the truth of what we are saying, and the introduction of sense-data adds nothing to our understanding of or ability to talk about what we see.

As an example, Austin examines the word 'real' and contrasts the ordinary meanings of that word based on everyday language and the ways it is used by sense-data theorists. In order to determine the meaning of 'real' we have to consider, case by case, the ways and contexts in which it is used. By observing that it is (i) a substantive-hungry word that is sometimes (ii) an adjuster-word, as well as (iii) a dimension-word and (iv) a word whose negative use "wears the trousers", Austin highlights its complexities. Only by doing so, according to Austin, can we avoid introducing false dichotomies.

=== Philosophical Papers ===
Austin's papers were collected and published posthumously as Philosophical Papers by J. O. Urmson and G. J. Warnock. The book originally contained ten papers, two more being added in the second edition and one in the third. His paper "A Plea for Excuses" has had a massive impact on criminal law theory.

Chapters 1 and 3 study how a word may have different, but related, senses. Chapters 2 and 4 discuss the nature of knowledge, focusing on performative utterance. Chapters 5 and 6 study the correspondence theory, where a statement is true when it corresponds to a fact. Chapters 6 and 10 concern the doctrine of speech acts. Chapters 8, 9, and 12 reflect on the problems that language encounters in discussing actions and considering the cases of excuses, accusations, and freedom.

=== "Are There A Priori Concepts?" ===
This early paper contains a broad criticism of idealism. The question set dealing with the existence of a priori concepts is treated only indirectly, by dismissing the concept of concept that underpins it.

The first part of this paper takes the form of a reply to an argument for the existence of universals: from observing that we do use words such as "grey" or "circular", and that we use a single term in each case, it follows that there must be a something that is named by such terms—a universal. Furthermore, since each case of "grey" or "circular" is different, it follows that universals themselves cannot be sensed.

Austin carefully dismantles this argument, and in the process other transcendental arguments. He points out first that universals are not "something we stumble across", and that they are defined by their relation to particulars. He continues by pointing out that, from the observation that we use "grey" and "circular" as if they were the names of things, it does not necessarily follow that these are actually things that exist, in any sense but the nominal. In the process he dismisses the notion that "words are essentially proper names", asking: "...why, if 'one identical' word is used, must there be 'one identical object' present which it denotes?"

In the second part of the article, he generalizes this argument against universals to address concepts as a whole. He points out that it is "facile" to treat concepts as if they were "an article of property". Such questions as "do we possess such-and-such a concept?" and "how do we come to possess such-and-such a concept?" are meaningless, because concepts are not the sort of thing that one possesses.

In the final part of the paper, Austin further extends the discussion to relations, presenting a series of arguments to reject the idea that there is some thing that is a relation. His argument likely follows from the conjecture of his colleague S. V. Tezlaf, who questioned what makes "this" "that".

=== "The Meaning of a Word" ===
The Meaning of a Word is a polemic against doing philosophy by attempting to pin down the meaning of the words used, arguing that 'there is no simple and handy appendage of a word called "the meaning of the word (x)"'.

Austin warns us to take care when removing words from their ordinary usage, giving numerous examples of how this can lead to error.

=== "Other Minds" ===
In Other Minds, one of his most highly acclaimed pieces, Austin criticizes the method that philosophers have used since Descartes to analyze and verify statements of the form "That person S feels X." This method works from the following three assumptions:

- (1) We can know only if we intuit and directly feel what he feels.
- (2) It is impossible to do so.
- (3) It may be possible to find strong evidence for belief in our impressions.

Although Austin agrees with (2), quipping that "we should be in a pretty predicament if I did [introspect another's feelings]", he found (1) to be false and (3) to be therefore unnecessary. The background assumption to (1), Austin claims, is that if I say that I know X and later find out that X is false, I did not know it. Austin believes that this is not consistent with the way we actually use language. He claims that if I was in a position where I would normally say that I know X, if X should turn out to be false, I would be speechless rather than self-corrective. He gives an argument that this is so by suggesting that believing is to knowing as intending is to promising— knowing and promising are the speech-act versions of believing and intending respectively.

=== "A Plea for Excuses" ===
A Plea for Excuses is both a demonstration by example, and a defense of the methods of ordinary language philosophy, which proceeds on the conviction that: "...our common stock of words embodies all the distinctions men have found worth drawing, and the connections they have found worth marking, in the lifetime of many generations: these surely are likely to be more numerous, more sound, since they have stood up to the long test of survival of the fittest, and more subtle, at least in all ordinary and reasonable practical matters, than any that you or I are likely to think up in our armchair of an afternoon—the most favourite alternative method."

An example of such a distinction Austin describes in a footnote is that between the phrases "by mistake" and "by accident". Although their uses are similar, Austin argues that with the right examples we can see that a distinction exists in when one or the other phrase is appropriate.

Austin proposes some curious philosophical tools. For instance, he uses a sort of word game for developing an understanding of a key concept. This involves taking up a dictionary and finding a selection of terms relating to the key concept, then looking up each of the words in the explanation of their meaning. This process is iterated until the list of words begins to repeat, closing a "family circle" of words relating to the key concept.

== Quotes ==
- "The theory of truth is a series of truisms." —Proceedings of the Aristotelian Society, vol. xxiv (1950). Philosophical Papers, p. 121. Oxford University Press, second edition (1970).
- "Sentences are not as such either true or false." —Sense and Sensibilia (1962), p. 111.
- "It is, of course, not really correct that a sentence ever is a statement: rather, it is used in making a statement, and the statement itself is a 'logical construction' out of the makings of statements." —How to Do Things with Words, Lecture 1, page 1 footnote 1. Oxford at the Clarendon press (1955).
- "Going back into the history of a word, very often into Latin, we come back pretty commonly to pictures or models of how things happen or are done. These models may be fairly sophisticated and recent, as is perhaps the case with 'motive' or 'impulse', but one of the commonest and most primitive types of model is one which is apt to baffle us through its very naturalness and simplicity." —"A Plea for Excuses" (1956). Published in Proceedings of the Aristotelian Society, 1956-7. Transcribed into hypertext by Andrew Chrucky, 23 August 2004.
- "A sentence is made up of words, a statement is made in words ... Statements are made, words or sentences are used." —Proceedings of the Aristotelian Society, vol. xxiv (1950); published in Philosophical Papers, p. 120. Oxford University Press, second edition (1970). (Note: Page 88 in the first edition.)
- "We walk along the cliff, and I feel a sudden impulse to push you over, which I promptly do: I acted on impulse, yet I certainly intended to push you over, and may even have devised a little ruse to achieve it; yet even then I did not act deliberately, for I did not (stop to) ask myself whether to do it or not." —Philosophical Papers, "The Meaning of a Word", p. 195. Oxford University Press, second edition (1970).
- "You are more than entitled not to know what the word 'performative' means. It is a new word and an ugly word, and perhaps it does not mean anything very much. But at any rate there is one thing in its favor, it is not a profound word." —Philosophical Papers, "Performative Utterances", p. 233. Oxford University Press, second edition (1970).
- "Let us distinguish between acting intentionally and acting deliberately or on purpose, as far as this can be done by attending to what language can teach us." —Philosophical Papers, "Three Ways of Spilling Ink", p. 273. Oxford University Press, second edition (1970).
- "Usually it is uses of words, not words in themselves, that are properly called 'vague.'" —Sense and Sensibilia, p. 126. Oxford University Press (1962).
- "But then we have to ask, of course, what this class comprises. We are given, as examples, 'familiar objects'—chairs, tables, pictures, books, flowers, pens, cigarettes; the expression 'material thing' is not here (or anywhere else in Ayer's text) further defined. But does the ordinary man believe that what he perceives is (always) something like furniture, or like these other 'familiar objects'—moderate-sized specimens of dry goods?" —Sense and Sensibilia, p. 8. Oxford University Press (1962).
- During a lecture at Columbia University attended by American philosopher Sidney Morgenbesser, Austin made the claim that although a double negative in English implies a positive meaning, there is no language in which a double positive implies a negative. To which Morgenbesser responded in a dismissive tone, "Yeah, yeah." (Some have quoted it as "Yeah, right.")

== Publications ==
=== Books ===
==== Authored ====
- Philosophical Papers, 1961, 1970, 1979 (eds. J. O. Urmson and G. J. Warnock), Oxford: Oxford University Press. ISBN 0-19-824627-7
- How to Do Things with Words: The William James Lectures delivered at Harvard University in 1955, 1962 (ed. J. O. Urmson), 2nd edition, 1975 (with Marina Sbisà), Oxford: Clarendon Press. ISBN 0-674-41152-8
- Sense and Sensibilia, 1962 (ed. G. J. Warnock), Oxford: Clarendon Press. ISBN 0-19-824579-3

==== Translated ====
- Frege, Gottlob (1960). The Foundations of Arithmetic: A Logico-Mathematical Enquiry Into the Concept of Number. Translated by Austin, J. L. (2nd ed.). New York: Harper. ISBN 0810106051. OCLC 650. (Translation of Die Grundlagen der Arithmetik.)

=== Papers and articles ===
- 1930s–1940s, "The Line and the Cave in Plato's Republic", reconstructed from notes by J. O. Urmson, in Philosophical Papers 1979
- 1938ms, extracts in: Price, A. (2018) "J. L. Austin's Lecture Notes on the Nicomachean Ethics: Making Sense of Aristotle on Akrasia." In Oxford Studies in Ancient Philosophy, V. 55.
- 1939ms/1967, "Agathon and Eudaimonia in the Ethics of Aristotle" in J. M. E. Moravcsik (ed.), Aristotle: a collection of critical essays, New York: Doubleday. Reprinted in Philosophical Papers 1970
- 1939, "Are There A Priori Concepts?" Proceedings of the Aristotelian Society, Supplementary Volume 18: 83–105. Reprinted in Philosophical Papers 1961
- 1940ms, "The Meaning of a Word" in Philosophical Papers 1961, Reprinted in C. E. Caton ed., Philosophy and Ordinary Language, University of Illinois Press 1963.
- 1946, "Other Minds", Proceedings of the Aristotelian Society, Supplementary Volume 20: 148–187. Reprinted in Philosophical Papers 1961
- 1950, "Truth", Proceedings of the Aristotelian Society, Supplementary Volume 24: 111–128. Reprinted in Philosophical Papers 1961, and in Proceedings of the Aristotelian Society Virtual Issue No. I: Truth (2013)
- 1953, "How to Talk—some simple ways", Proceedings of the Aristotelian Society, 53: 227–246. Reprinted in Philosophical Papers 1961
- 1954ms, "Unfair to Facts" in Philosophical Papers 1961
- 1956a, "Ifs and Cans", Proceedings of the British Academy. Reprinted in Philosophical Papers 1961
- 1956b, "Performative Utterances", corrected transcript of an unscripted radio talk delivered in the Third Programme of the BBC. In Philosophical Papers 1961
- 1957, "A Plea for Excuses: The Presidential Address", Proceedings of the Aristotelian Society, 57: 1–30. Reprinted in Philosophical Papers 1961
- 1958, "Pretending" Proceedings of the Aristotelian Society, Supplementary Volume 32: 261–278. Reprinted in Philosophical Papers 1961
- 1962, "Performatif-Constatif" in Cahiers de Royaumont, Philosophie No. IV, La Philosophie Analytique, pp. 271–304 (Paris, Les Editions de Minuit). Includes discussion (all in French) chaired by Willard van Orman Quine with questions to Austin from Éric Weil, R. M. Hare, Philippe Devaux, Jean Wahl, Chaim Perelman and Jean Poirier, and replies to each by Austin.
  - Translated in 1963 as "Performative-Constative" (including the discussion) by G. J. Warnock, in C. E. Caton ed., Philosophy and Ordinary Language, University of Illinois Press.
- 1966, "Three Ways of Spilling Ink", L. W. Forguson (ed.), The Philosophical Review, 75 (4): 427–440. Reprinted in Approaches to Ethics, 2d ed., ed. W. T. Jones, F. Sontag, M. O. Beckner, and R. J. Fogelin (New York: McGraw Hill Book Co., 1969), and Philosophical Papers 1970,

== See also ==
- Performative turn – Linguistic quality
- Adolf Reinach – German philosopher (1883–1917)
