= Ordinary language philosophy =

View that philosophical problems are distortions of natural language

Ordinary language philosophy (OLP) is a philosophical methodology that sees traditional philosophical problems as rooted in misunderstandings philosophers develop by distorting or forgetting how words are ordinarily used to convey meaning in non-philosophical contexts. "Such 'philosophical' uses of language, on this view, create the very philosophical problems they are employed to solve."

This approach typically involves eschewing philosophical "theories" in favor of close attention to the details of the use of everyday "ordinary" language. Its earliest forms are associated with the later work of Ludwig Wittgenstein and a number of mid-20th century philosophers who can be split into two main groups, neither of which could be described as an organized "school". In its earlier stages, contemporaries of Wittgenstein at Cambridge University such as Norman Malcolm, Alice Ambrose, Friedrich Waismann, Oets Kolk Bouwsma and Morris Lazerowitz started to develop ideas recognisable as ordinary language philosophy. These ideas were further elaborated from 1945 onwards through the work of some Oxford University philosophers led initially by Gilbert Ryle, then followed by J. L. Austin and Paul Grice. This Oxford group also included H. L. A. Hart, Geoffrey Warnock, J. O. Urmson and P. F. Strawson. The close association between ordinary language philosophy and these later thinkers has led to it sometimes being called "Oxford philosophy". The posthumous publication of Wittgenstein's Philosophical Investigations in 1953 further solidified the notion of ordinary language philosophy. Philosophers a generation after Austin who made use of the method of ordinary language philosophy include Antony Flew, Stanley Cavell, John Searle and Oswald Hanfling. Today, Alice Crary, Nancy Bauer, Sandra Laugier, as well as literary theorists Toril Moi, Rita Felski, and Shoshana Felman have adopted the teachings of Cavell in particular, generating a resurgence of interest in ordinary language philosophy.

== Central ideas ==
The later Wittgenstein held that the meanings of words reside in their ordinary uses and that this is why philosophers trip over words taken in abstraction. From this came the idea that philosophy had gotten into trouble by trying to use words outside of the context of their use in ordinary language. For example, "understanding" is what you mean when you say "I understand". "Knowledge" is what you mean when you say "I know". The point is that you already know what "understanding" or "knowledge" are, at least implicitly. Philosophers are ill-advised to construct new definitions of these terms, because this is necessarily a redefinition, and the argument may unravel into self-referential nonsense. Rather, philosophers must explore the definitions these terms already have, without forcing convenient redefinitions onto them.

The controversy really begins when ordinary language philosophers apply the same leveling tendency to questions such as What is Truth? or What is Consciousness? Philosophers in this school would insist that we cannot assume that (for example) truth 'is' a 'thing' (in the same sense that tables and chairs are 'things') that the word 'truth' represents. Instead, we must look at the differing ways in which the words 'truth' and 'conscious' actually function in ordinary language. We may well discover, after investigation, that there is no single entity to which the word 'truth' corresponds, something Wittgenstein attempts to get across via his concept of a 'family resemblance' (cf. Philosophical Investigations). Therefore, ordinary language philosophers tend to be anti-essentialist.

== History ==
Early analytic philosophy had a less positive view of ordinary language. Bertrand Russell tended to dismiss language as being of little philosophical significance, and ordinary language as just too confused to help solve metaphysical and epistemological problems. Gottlob Frege, the Vienna Circle (especially Rudolf Carnap), the young Wittgenstein, and W. V. O. Quine all attempted to improve upon it, in particular using the resources of modern logic. In his Tractatus Logico-Philosophicus Wittgenstein more or less agreed with Russell that language ought to be reformulated so as to be unambiguous, so as to accurately represent the world, so that we can better deal with philosophical questions.

By contrast, Wittgenstein later described his task as bringing "words back from their metaphysical to their everyday use". The sea change brought on by his unpublished work in the 1930s centered largely on the idea that there is nothing wrong with ordinary language as it stands, and that many traditional philosophical problems are only illusions brought on by misunderstandings about language and related subjects. The former idea led to rejecting the approaches of earlier analytic philosophy—arguably, of any earlier philosophy—and the latter led to replacing them with careful attention to language in its normal use, in order to "dissolve" the appearance of philosophical problems, rather than attempt to solve them. At its inception, ordinary language philosophy was taken as either an extension of or as an alternative to analytic philosophy.

Ordinary language analysis largely flourished and developed at Oxford University in the 1940s, under Austin and Ryle, and was quite widespread for a time before declining rapidly in popularity in the late 1960s and early 1970s. Despite this decline, Stanley Cavell and John Searle (both students of Austin) published seminal texts which draw significantly from the ordinary language tradition in 1969. Cavell more explicitly adopted the banner of ordinary language philosophy and inspired a generation of philosophers and literary theorists to reexamine the merits of this philosophical approach, all the while distancing himself from the limitations of traditional analytic philosophy. This caused a relatively recent resurgence of interest in this methodology, with some updates particularly due to the literature and teachings of Cavell, has also become a mainstay of what might be called postanalytic philosophy. Seeking to avoid the increasingly metaphysical and abstruse language found in mainstream analytic philosophy, posthumanism, and post-structuralism, a number of feminist philosophers have adopted the methods of ordinary language philosophy. Many of these philosophers were students or colleagues of Cavell.

There are some affinities between contemporary ordinary language philosophy and philosophical pragmatism (or neopragmatism). Interestingly, the pragmatist philosopher F. C. S. Schiller might be seen as a forerunner to ordinary language philosophy, especially in his noted publication Riddles of the Sphinx.

Seneca the Younger described the activities of other philosophers in ways that reflect some of the same concerns as ordinary language philosophers.

For these men, too, have left to us, not positive discoveries, but problems whose solution is still to be sought. They might perhaps have discovered the essentials, had they not sought the superfluous also. They lost much time in quibbling about words and in sophistical argumentation; all that sort of thing exercises the wit to no purpose. We tie knots and bind up words in double meanings, and then try to untie them. Have we leisure enough for this? Do we already know how to live, or die? We should rather proceed with our whole souls towards the point where it is our duty to take heed lest things, as well as words, deceive us. Why, pray, do you discriminate between similar words, when nobody is ever deceived by them except during the discussion? It is things that lead us astray: it is between things that you must discriminate.

== Criticism ==
One of the most ardent critics of ordinary language philosophy was a student at Oxford (and later a philosopher himself), Ernest Gellner, who said:

"[A]t that time the orthodoxy best described as linguistic philosophy, inspired by Wittgenstein, was crystallizing and seemed to me totally and utterly misguided. Wittgenstein's basic idea was that there is no general solution to issues other than the custom of the community. Communities are ultimate. He didn't put it this way, but that was what it amounted to. And this doesn't make sense in a world in which communities are not stable and are not clearly isolated from each other. Nevertheless, Wittgenstein managed to sell this idea, and it was enthusiastically adopted as an unquestionable revelation. It is very hard nowadays for people to understand what the atmosphere was like then. This was the Revelation. It wasn't doubted. But it was quite obvious to me it was wrong. It was obvious to me the moment I came across it, although initially, if your entire environment, and all the bright people in it, hold something to be true, you assume you must be wrong, not understanding it properly, and they must be right. And so I explored it further and finally came to the conclusion that I did understand it right, and it was rubbish, which indeed it is."

— Ernest Gellner, Interview with John Davis, 1991

Gellner criticized ordinary language philosophy in his book Words and Things published in 1959.

== See also ==
- Definitions of philosophy
- Ideal language philosophy
- Linguistic phenomenology
