= Descriptive fallacy =

The descriptive fallacy refers to reasoning which treats a speech act as a proposition, which would be mistaken when the meaning of the statement is not based on its truth condition. It was suggested by the British philosopher of language J. L. Austin in 1955 in the lectures now known as How to Do Things With Words. Austin argued that performative utterances are not meaningfully evaluated as true or false but rather by other measures, which would hold that a statement such as "thank you" is not meant to describe a fact and to interpret it as such would be to commit the descriptive fallacy.

== Role of 'descriptive fallacy' in Austin's philosophy ==
Austin's label of 'descriptive fallacy' was aimed primarily at logical positivism, and his speech act theory was largely a response to logical positivism's view that only statements that are logically or empirically verifiable have cognitive meaning. Logical positivism aimed to approach philosophy on the model of empirical science, seeking to express philosophical statements in ways to render them verifiable by empirical means. Statements that cannot be verified as either true or false are seen as meaningless. This would exclude many statements about religion, metaphysics, aesthetics, or ethics as meaningless and philosophically uninteresting, making merely emotive or evocative claims expressing one's feelings rather than making verifiable claims about reality.

Austin disagreed with the positivists' contention that the only philosophically significant use of language is to describe reality by stating facts, pointing out that speakers do much more with language than merely describe reality. For example, asking questions, making requests or issuing orders, offering invitations, making promises, and many other common statements are not descriptive. Rather, they are performative: in making such statements, speakers do things rather than describe things.

Based on this distinction of what Austin labeled as 'constative' utterances (statements that describe, which were the focus of logical positivism) and 'performative' utterances (statements that perform or do something), Austin developed his speech act theory to investigate how we do things with words.
