= H. A. Prichard =

English philosopher (1871–1947)

- Born: Harold Arthur Prichard; 30 October 1871; London, England
- Died: 29 December 1947 (aged 76); Oxford, England
- Spouse: Mabel Henrietta Ross

Education
- Education: New College, Oxford
- Academic advisor: J. Cook Wilson

Philosophical work
- Era: 20th-century philosophy
- Region: Western philosophy
- School: Analytic philosophy Ethical intuitionism Direct realism
- Institutions: University of Oxford
- Notable students: J. L. Austin; E. F. Carritt; H. H. Price
- Main interests: Ethics; Philosophy of perception
- Notable ideas: Ethical intuitionism grounded in the direct apprehension of duty Criticism of utilitarianism as incapable of grounding obligation

Harold Arthur Prichard (30 October 1871 – 29 December 1947) was an English philosopher.

== Biography ==
He was born in London in 1871, the eldest child of Walter Stennett Prichard (a solicitor) and his wife Lucy.

Harold Prichard was a scholar at Clifton College from where he won a scholarship to New College, Oxford, to study mathematics. But, after taking first-class honours in mathematical moderations (preliminary examinations) in 1891, he studied Greats (ancient history and philosophy), taking first-class honours in 1894. He also played tennis for Oxford against Cambridge. On leaving Oxford, he spent a brief period working for a firm of solicitors in London before returning to Oxford, where he spent the rest of his life, first as a Fellow of Hertford College (1895–98) and then of Trinity College (1898–1924). He took early retirement from Trinity in 1924 on grounds of ill health, but recovered and was elected White's Professor of Moral Philosophy in 1928 and became a fellow of Corpus Christi College. He retired in 1937.

== Philosophical work ==
Prichard gave an influential defence of ethical intuitionism in his "Does Moral Philosophy Rest on a Mistake?" (1912), wherein he contended that moral philosophy rested chiefly on the desire to provide arguments, starting from non-normative premises, for the principles of obligation that we pre-philosophically accept, such as the principle that one ought to keep one's promises or that one ought not steal. This is a mistake, he argued, both because it is impossible to derive any statement about what one ought to do from statements not concerning obligation (even statements about what is good) and because there is no need to do so since common sense principles of moral obligation are self-evident. The essay laid the groundwork for ethical intuitionism and provided inspiration for some of the most influential moral philosophers, such as John Rawls.

=== Criticism of utilitarianism ===
Prichard attacks utilitarianism as not being capable of forming obligations. He states that one cannot justify an obligation by pointing to the consequences of the obligated action because pointing to the consequences only shows that the action is desirable or advisable, not that it is obligatory. In other words, he claims that, while utilitarianism may encourage people to do actions which a moral person would do, it cannot create a moral obligation to do those actions.

=== Deriving moral obligation ===
H. A. Prichard is an ethical intuitionist, meaning he believed that it is through our moral intuitions that we come to know right and wrong. Further, while he believes that moral obligations are justified by reasons, he does not believe that the reasons are external to the obligation itself. For instance, if a person is asked why one ought not to torture chipmunks, the only satisfying answer that could be given is that one ought not to torture chipmunks.

Prichard, along with other intuitionists, adopts a foundationalist approach to morality. Foundationalism is a theory of epistemology which states that there are certain fundamental principles which are the basis for all other knowledge. In the case of ethics, foundationalists hold that certain fundamental moral rules are their own justification. Walter Sinnott-Armstrong explains:

One central problem in moral epistemology, as in general epistemology, is the skeptical regress argument. It seems that, if a person is justified in holding a certain moral belief, that person must have some reason to believe it. That reason must be expressible in some argument. That argument must have some premises. If the person is not justified in believing its premises, that argument cannot make that person justified in believing its conclusion. But, if the person is to be justified in believing those new premises, then the believer needs an-other argument for those premises. That argument must itself have further premises. And so on. The simplest way to stop this regress is simply to stop. If a believer can work back to a premise that the believer is justified in believing without being able to infer that premise from anything else, then there is no new premise to justify, so the regress goes no further. That is how foundationalists stop the regress in general epistemology. Moral intuitionists apply foundationalism to moral beliefs as a way to stop the skeptical regress regarding moral beliefs.

Therefore, Prichard concludes, just as observation of other people necessitates that other people exist, observation of a moral obligation necessitates that the obligation exists. Prichard finishes his essay by answering a few obvious problems. Most notably, he explains how people should guarantee the accuracy of their moral intuitions. Clearly, observations can be misleading. For instance, someone who sees a pencil in water may conclude that the object in the water is bent. However, when the pencil is pulled from the water, it is seen to be straight. The same can occur with moral intuition. If one begins to doubt one's intuition, one should try to imagine oneself in the moral dilemma related to the decision. If the intuition persists, then the intuition is accurate. Prichard further supports these claims by pointing out how it is illegitimate to doubt previously believed moral intuitions:

With these considerations in mind, consider the parallel which, as it seems to me, is presented though with certain differences by Moral Philosophy. The sense that we ought to do certain things arises in our unreflective consciousness, being an activity of moral thinking occasioned by the various situations in which we find ourselves. At this stage our attitude to these obligations is one of unquestioning confidence. But inevitably the appreciation of the degree to which the execution of these obligations is contrary to our interest raises the doubt whether after all these obligations are, really obligatory, i.e., whether our sense that we ought not to do certain things is not illusion. We then want to have it proved to us that we ought to do so, i.e., to be convinced of this by a process which, as an argument, is different in kind from our original and unreflective appreciation of it. This demand IS, as I have argued, illegitimate. Hence in the first place, if, as is almost universally the case, by Moral Philosophy is meant the knowledge which would satisfy this demand, there is no such knowledge, and all attempts to attain it are doomed to failure because they rest on a mistake, the mistake of supposing the possibility of proving what can only be apprehended directly by an act of moral thinking.

== Personal life ==
Prichard married lecturer Mabel Henrietta Ross in 1899. Ross was born in India in 1875 and she helped found St Anne's College; she lived until 1965.

== Writings ==
- Kant's Theory of Knowledge (Oxford, 1909) – online
- "Does Moral Philosophy Rest on a Mistake?" Mind 21 (1912): 21–37. Reprinted in Moral Obligation.
- Moral Obligation, Essays and Lectures (London, 1949; 1968)
- Knowledge and Perception, Essays and Lectures (London, 1950)
