= Sérgio Dias Branco =

Portuguese film critic

Sérgio Dias Branco T.O.S.D
- Born: 5 September 1977 (age 49); Lisbon, Portugal
- Occupations: Film critic, film theorist, television theorist, trade unionist

Academic background
- Education: University of Lisbon (B.A.); University of Kent (M.A., Ph.D.)
- Influences: Aquinas; Bazin; Cavell; Marx; McCabe

Academic work
- Institutions: NOVA University Lisbon; University of Coimbra

Sérgio Dias Branco (born 5 September 1977) is a film critic, film and television theorist, philosopher, theologian, and trade unionist. He is an associate professor of Film Studies at the University of Coimbra and a member of the National Council of the General Confederation of the Portuguese Workers (CGTP-IN), the largest trade union federation in Portugal.

== Career ==
His teaching career in higher education began at the University of Kent, where he was awarded a PhD in film studies. He then taught at NOVA University Lisbon before moving to the University of Coimbra. He is the director of the MA in Art Studies and coordinator of LIPA - Laboratory for Investigating and Practicing Art at the University of Coimbra.

=== Research ===
Branco is a researcher at the Centre for 20th Century Interdisciplinary Studies (CEIS20) at the University of Coimbra, after leaving the NOVA Institute of Philosophy. He has been an invited member of the film criticism group "The Magnifying Class" at the University of Oxford, coordinated by Andrew Klevan. He develops research in the scientific areas of film, religious, television, and working-class studies.

=== Journals ===
From 2010 to 2019, he was one of the editors of Cinema: Journal of Philosophy and the Moving Image. He co-edits Conversations: The Journal of Cavellian Studies, the only academic journal dedicated to the study and discussion of Stanley Cavell’s work.

=== Affiliations ===
He was elected for the Direction Board of the Association of Moving Image Researchers (AIM) between 2014 and 2020 and its president between 2018 and 2020. Branco is also a member of the Working-Class Studies Association since 2017 and of the European Network for Cinema and Media Studies and the Society for Cinema and Media Studies since 2011 and 2009, respectively.

== Religion ==
A lay member of the Order of Preachers, Branco is a devout Catholic. He was received into the Lay Fraternity of Saint Dominic in Porto in 2012 and made his perpetual profession as a lay Dominican in 2017, in a Mass presided by the then Master of the Order, Bruno Cadoré, in Fatima.

Branco was a regular contributor for Pontos SJ, the portal of the Jesuits in Portugal.

Since 2022, he coordinates Terra da Fraternidade. It is described as “an independent and inclusive space for meeting and intervention in the religious sphere, powered by voices from different traditions and spiritualities that fight for social progress”.

== Activism ==
Much of his political activism has to do with uniting the Left. As a trade unionist, he has been a member of the Teachers’ Union of the Centre Region and the National Federation of Teachers, acting in various capacities since 2014. In 2020, in the XIII Congress of the CGTP-IN, he was elected for the National Council and its executive board, a possibility previously disclosed by the press.

He is affiliated with the left-wing political association Democratic Intervention. Branco has run as a candidate for the Unitary Democratic Coalition.

== Publications ==
=== Books ===
- O Trabalho das Imagens: Estudos sobre Cinema e Marxismo [The Work of Images: Studies on Cinema and Marxism]. Lisbon: Página a Página, 2020. [in Portuguese]
- Escrita em Movimento: Apontamentos Críticos sobre Filmes [Writing in Motion: Critical Notes on Films]. Lisbon: Documenta, 2020. ISBN 978-989-9006-32-4 [in Portuguese]
- Por Dentro das Imagens: Obras de Cinema, Ideias do Cinema [Within Images: Film Works, Cinema Ideas]. Lisbon: Documenta, 2016. ISBN 978-9898618924 [in Portuguese]

=== Selected edited journal issues ===
- Cinema: Journal of Philosophy and the Moving Image, no. 9, “Islam and Images” (with Patrícia Silveirinha Castello Branco and Saeed Zeydabadi-Nejad). ISSN 1647-8991
- Cinema: Journal of Philosophy and the Moving Image, no. 8, “Marx’s Philosophy” (with Michael Wayne). ISSN 1647-8991
- Cinema: Journal of Philosophy and the Moving Image, no. 4, “Philosophy of Religion”. ISSN 1647-8991

=== Selected articles and book chapters ===
- “The Urban and the Domestic: Spaces of American Film Noir”. In New Approaches to Cinematic Spaces, ed. Filipa Rosário and Iván Villarmea Álvarez, pp. 85–96. London: Routledge, 2018. ISBN 978-113-860-444-5
- “The Past Tense of Our Selves: Um Adeus Português in 1980s Portugal”. Journal of Lusophone Studies, vol. 2, no. 1, "Special Dossier on Portuguese Cinema", ed. Clara Rowland and Estela Vieira, pp. 41–58. ISSN 2469-4800
- “Sembène, Ousmane (1923-2007)”. In The Palgrave Encyclopedia of Imperialism and Anti-Imperialism, Vol. I, ed. Immanuel Ness and Zack Cope, pp. 218–222. Basingstoke: Palgrave Macmillan, 2016. ISBN 978-023-039-277-9
- "Kino Kino Kino Kino Kino: Guy Maddin’s Cinema of Artifice". L’Atalante: Revista de estudios cinematográficos, no. 19, coord. Pablo Hernández Miñano and Violeta Martín Núñez, pp. 105–10. Valencia: University of Valencia, 2015. ISSN 2340-6992
- “Situating Comedy: Duration and Inhabitation in Classical American Sitcoms”. In Television Aesthetics and Style, ed. Jason Jacobs and Steven Peacock, pp. 93–102. New York: Bloomsbury, 2013. ISBN 978-144-117-992-0
