= Somaesthetics =

Somaesthetics is an interdisciplinary field of inquiry aimed at promoting and integrating the theoretical, empirical and practical disciplines related to bodily perception, performance and presentation.

== Etymology ==
The term ‘somaesthetics’ was coined by the American pragmatist philosopher Richard Shusterman in 1996 through the compounding of “soma”, an expression derived from the Greek word for body, and “aesthetics”, a word derived from the Greek aesthesis, meaning ‘sensory perception’. Shusterman has reported in a number of his works that he chose ‘soma’ over more familiar terms “to avoid problematic associations of body (which can be a lifeless, mindless thing) and flesh (which designates only the fleshly parts of the body and is strongly associated with Christian notions of sin)” and to emphasize that the project “concerns the lived, sentient, purposive body rather than merely a physical body”. As an amalgamation, ‘somaesthetics’ “implies a project of appreciating and cultivating the body not only as an object that externally displays beauty, sublimity, grace, and other aesthetic qualities, but also as a subjectivity that perceives these qualities and that experiences attendant aesthetic pleasures somatically”.

== Origin and development ==
Somaesthetics as a research project initially arose from the work of Richard Shusterman during the mid-1990s in response to what he perceived as needed developments within his two principal modes of inquiry: pragmatist aesthetics and philosophy as an embodied art of living. While pragmatist aesthetics, according to Shusterman, advocates for more active and creative engagement than traditional aesthetics, he believed it should also recognize that artistic, practical and political action requires humanity’s primary tool, the body, and that such action could be improved partly by improving this instrument. In the same way, the philosophical life could be improved through greater mastery of the soma -- our medium of living. He moreover lamented the reduction of aesthetics (as well as philosophy itself) from “a noble art of living into a minor, specialized university discipline” narrowly concerned with beauty and fine art. Shusterman thus argued for the revival of “Baumgarten’s idea of aesthetics as a life-improving cognitive discipline that extends far beyond questions of beauty and fine arts and that involves both theory and practical exercise” and for an end to “the neglect of the body that Baumgarten disastrously introduced into aesthetics”. As proposed, Shusterman’s project of somaesthetics would restore “the soma — the living, sentient, purposive body — as the indispensable medium for all perception". Such heightening of somatic consciousness would not only enhance artistic appreciation and creation, but increase the perceptual awareness of meanings and feelings that have the potential to elevate everyday experience into an art of living.

Shusterman proposed three fundamental dimensions of his emerging field:

- Analytic somaesthetics, as the most theoretically-oriented of the three, “describes the basic nature of bodily perceptions and practices and also of their function in our knowledge and construction of reality”.

- Pragmatic somaesthetics presupposes the analytic dimension and “has a distinctly normative, prescriptive character – by proposing specific methods of somatic improvement and engaging in their comparative critique”.

- Practical somaesthetics focuses on practicing somatic care “through intelligently disciplined body work aimed at somatic self-improvement (whether in a representational, experiential, or performative mode)".

Since the concept of somaesthetics was introduced in the mid-1990s, it has become an interdisciplinary endeavor. Originally conceived by Shusterman as being under the umbrella of philosophy, or perhaps even a branch of aesthetics, somaesthetics has evolved into an “open field for collaborative, interdisciplinary, and transcultural inquiry” with applications “ranging from the arts, product design, and politics to fashion, health, sports, martial arts, and the use of hallucinogenic drugs in education”.
