= Nancy Bauer (philosopher) =

American philosopher

- Occupations: Academic philosopher, Dean of the School of the Museum of Fine Arts at Tufts, Dean of Academic Affairs, School of Arts and Sciences, and Professor of Philosophy at Tufts University
- Partner: Mark Richard
- Awards: Radcliffe Institute Fellowship, Joseph A. and Lillian Leibner Award for Distinguished Advising and Teaching

Education
- Education: Harvard University (Ph.D.)
- Doctoral advisor: Stanley Cavell, Hilary Putnam

Philosophical work
- Era: Contemporary philosophy
- Region: Western philosophy
- School: Postanalytic philosophy, Ordinary language philosophy, Existentialism
- Institutions: Tufts University
- Main interests: Feminism, Ethics, Higher education, Pornography
- Notable ideas: Pornography as Illocutionary act

For the Canadian writer and editor, see Nancy Bauer.

Nancy Bauer is an American philosopher specializing in feminist philosophy, existentialism and phenomenology, and the work of Simone de Beauvoir. She was recently Chair of the Philosophy Department at Tufts University and is currently Dean of Academic Affairs and Professor of Philosophy as well as the Dean of the School of the Museum of Fine Arts at Tufts. Her interests include methodology in philosophy, feminism, metaphysics, social/political/moral philosophy, philosophy of language, phenomenology, and philosophy in film.

== Education and career ==
Bauer earned an A. B. in Social Studies, magna cum laude, from Harvard and Radcliffe Colleges in 1982. She earned a Master of Theological Studies from Harvard Divinity School in 1986, and was a Ph.D. candidate in the Study of Religion, 1986–1988. She earned a Ph.D. in philosophy from Harvard University in 1997, studying under Stanley Cavell. Prior to her position as a professor, she was a journalist, holding a position on the Metro Desk at the Boston Globe, where she also served as the paper's first full-time Cape Cod beat reporter. She has also worked for Boston Children's Hospital and contributed to the New Child Health Encyclopedia.

== Research and publications ==
Bauer's first book was "Simone de Beauvoir, Philosophy, and Feminism," New York: Columbia University Press, 2001. She has also published on pornography, objectification, and philosophy of film.

In a June 20, 2010 New York Times opinion piece, she wrote:

The goal of "The Second Sex" is to get women, and men, to crave freedom — social, political and psychological — more than the precarious kind of happiness that an unjust world intermittently begrudges to the people who play by its rules. Beauvoir warned that you can't just will yourself to be free, that is, to abjure relentlessly the temptations to want only what the world wants you to want. For her the job of the philosopher, at least as much as the fiction writer, is to re-describe how things are in a way that competes with the status quo story and leaves us craving social justice and the truly wide berth for self-expression that only it can provide.

She is a member of the Society for Interdisciplinary Feminist Phenomenology.

== Awards ==
- Joseph A. and Lillian Leibner Award for Distinguished Advising and Teaching, 2005
- Radcliffe Institute Fellowship, 2002–2003

== Publications ==
- "Simone de Beauvoir, Philosophy, and Feminism," New York: Columbia University Press, 2001.
- "Hegel and Feminist Politics: A Symposium," with Kimberley Hutchings, Tuija Pulkkinen, and Alison Stone, Feminist Engagements With Hegel, Columbia University Press, forthcoming.
- "Beauvoir on the Allure of Self-Objectification," (Re)découvrir l'oeuvre de Simone de Beauvoir: Du Deuxième Sexe à La Cérémonie des adieux, edited by Pascale Fautrier, Pierre-Louis Fort, and Anne Strasser (Paris: Le Bord de L'Eau, 2008): 249 – 256.
- "The Second Feminism," Symposia on Gender, Race, and Philosophy, October 2007.
- "The N-Word," Fringe 10 (June 2007).
- "Pornutopia," n+1 5 (Winter 2007): 63 – 73.
- "How to Do Things With Pornography," Reading Cavell, edited by Sanford Shieh and Alice Crary (New York: Routledge, 2006).
- "On Human Understanding," Wittgensteinian Fideism, edited by Kai Nielsen and D. Z. Phillips (Norwich, England: SCM Press, 2006).
- "Beauvoir's Heideggerian Ontology," The Philosophy of Simone de Beauvoir: Critical Essays, edited by Margaret A. Simons (Indiana University Press, 2006).
- "Cogito Ergo Film: Plato, Descartes, and Fight Club," Film as Philosophy: Essays on Cinema After Wittgenstein and Cavell, edited by Rupert Read (Florence, KY: Palgrave Macmillan, 2005).
- "Must We Read Simone de Beauvoir?" The Legacy of Simone de Beauvoir, edited by Emily Grosholz (New York: Oxford University Press, 2004).
- "Is Feminist Philosophy a Contradiction in Terms?" Twenty Questions: An Introduction to Philosophy, 5th ed., edited by G. Lee Bowie, Robert C. Solomon, Meredith W. Michaels (Florence, KY: Wadsworth, 2003). An abridgement of chapter 1 of Simone de Beauvoir, Philosophy, and Feminism.
- "Being-with as Being-against: Heidegger Meets Hegel in The Second Sex," Continental Philosophy Review, Vol. 34, No. 2 (June 2001).
- "First Philosophy, The Second Sex, and the Third Wave," Labyrinth, Vol. 1, No. 1 (Winter 1999). Reprinted in Simone de Beauvoir: 50 Jahre nach Dem Anderen Geschlecht, edited by Yvanka B. Raynova and Susanne Moser (Vienna: Institute for Axiological Research, 1999). A different version of chapter 2 of Simone de Beauvoir, Philosophy, and Feminism.
- "Sum Femina Inde Cogito: Das andere Geschleht und Die Meditationen," Die Philosophin 20 (October 1999): 41 – 61.
