= J. O. Urmson =

British philosopher and classicist (1915–2012)

J. O. Urmson MC
- Urmson in 1972
- Born: James Opie Urmson; 4 March 1915; Hornsea, England
- Died: 29 January 2012 (aged 96)

Academic background
- Education: Corpus Christi College, Oxford

Academic work
- Era: 20th-century philosophy
- Discipline: Philosophy
- Sub-discipline: Ethics, philosophy of language, history of philosophy
- Region: Western philosophy
- School or tradition: Analytic; Ordinary language philosophy
- Institutions: Christ Church, Oxford; Queen's College, Dundee; Corpus Christi College, Oxford; Stanford University
- Doctoral students: Richard Shusterman
- Notable ideas: Contemporary non-religious analysis of supererogation, parenthetical verbs, quantifier variance
- Military career
- Service: British Army
- Service years: 1939 – c. 1945
- Rank: Captain
- Units: 1st Battalion, Duke of Wellington's Regiment
- Wars: Second World War

James Opie Urmson (/ˈɜːrmsən/; 4 March 1915 – 29 January 2012) was a British philosopher and classicist who spent most of his professional career at Corpus Christi College, Oxford. He was a prolific author and expert on a number of topics including British analytic philosophy, George Berkeley, ethics, and Greek philosophy (especially Aristotle).

== Life and career ==
Monckton Cottage in Headington, Oxford

J. O. Urmson was born in Hornsea. He was named after his father, James Opie Urmson (1881–1954), a Methodist minister. Urmson was educated at Kingswood School, Bath (1928–1934), and Corpus Christi College, Oxford (1934–38).

In 1938 he became a Senior Demy of Magdalen College, Oxford. From 1939 till 1945 he was, given his war service, "rather nominally" a Fellow by Examination at the college. When the Second World War broke out, he joined the army. He was awarded the Military Cross in 1943. He was taken prisoner in Italy in 1944, remaining in captivity in Germany until the end of the war in Europe. He spent his time as a prisoner of war "playing bridge and doing mathematics."

After the war he was a 'Student' (i.e. a fellow) (Note: Christ Church is peculiar in that it calls its fellows "Students".) of Christ Church, Oxford, from 1945 to 1955. During this period he lived in Monckton Cottage in Headington, Oxford.

In 1955 he accepted an appointment as Professor of Philosophy at Queen's College Dundee, then part of the University of St Andrews in Scotland. In 1959 he returned to Oxford as a Fellow of Corpus Christi College, Oxford and a Tutor in Philosophy. He held both positions until 1978. From 1975 to 1980 he was Stuart professor of philosophy at Stanford University. In 1980 he became an emeritus professor at Stanford and emeritus fellow of Corpus Christi.

== Achievements ==
Urmson and his co-editor G. J. Warnock performed an invaluable service to the development of analytic and linguistic philosophy by preparing for publication the papers of the Oxford linguistic philosopher J. L. Austin.

After World War II, Urmson's book Philosophical Analysis (1956) – an overview of the development of analytic philosophy at Cambridge and Oxford universities between World War I and World War II – was influential in the post-war spread of analytic philosophy in Anglophone countries.

David Heyd records that "the history of supererogation in non-religious ethical theory" began with Urmson's 'seminal' "Saints and Heroes" (1958). This paper, according to Heyd, "opened the contemporary discussion of supererogation," while hardly mentioning the term, "by challenging the traditional threefold classification of moral action: the obligatory, the permitted (or indifferent) and the prohibited."

Urmson translated or wrote notes for a number of volumes of Aristotle, and commentaries on Aristotle's Physics by Simplicius, for the Ancient Commentators on Aristotle series published in the US by Cornell University Press, in the UK initially by Duckworth, now by Bloomsbury, under the general editorship of Richard Sorabji. His book Aristotle's Ethics was praised by J. L. Ackrill and Julius Moravcsik as an excellent introduction to Aristotle's Ethics.

Although, as Jonathan Rée notes, many of Urmson's writings "focus on theories about the nature of philosophy", Urmson holds that "on the whole the best philosophy is little affected by theory; the philosopher sees what needs doing and does it."

== Works ==
=== Edited volumes ===
- (with G. J. Warnock) J. L. Austin Philosophical Papers 1961
- J. L. Austin How to Do Things with Words 1962 (2nd edition, 1975, with Marina Sbisà)
- Concise Encyclopedia of Western Philosophy and Philosophers 1960 (with Jonathan Rée: second edition 1989, third edition 2004)

=== Translations ===
- Aristotle The Nicomachean Ethics (translated W. D. Ross, 1925; revised J. O. Urmson and J. L. Ackrill, 1980) Oxford University Press
- Simplicius Corollaries on Place and Time Cornell University Press, 1992
- On Aristotle's "Physics 3 by Simplicius, translated by J. O. Urmson & Peter Lautner, 2002, ISBN 978-0-8014-3903-2.

=== Books ===
- Philosophical Analysis: Its Development between the Two World Wars, Oxford University Press (1956)
- The Emotive Theory of Ethics (1968)
- The Greek Philosophical Vocabulary, Duckworth (1990)
- Berkeley Oxford University Press (1982), reprinted in The British Empiricists: Locke, Berkeley, Hume (1992)
- Aristotle's Ethics (1988) Blackwell Publishers

=== Articles and book chapters ===
- "On Grading", Mind (April 1950), 59(234):145–169, reprinted in Logic and Language (Second Series) (ed. Antony Flew, Basil Blackwell, Oxford, 1953)
- "Parenthetical Verbs" Mind (October 1952), 61(244):480–496, reprinted in Antony Flew (ed.) Essays in Conceptual Analysis (1956)
- "Some Questions Concerning Validity" Revue Internationale de Philosophie Vol. 7, No. 25 (3) (1953), reprinted in Antony Flew (ed.) Essays in Conceptual Analysis (1956)
- "The Interpretation of the Moral Philosophy of J. S. Mill", The Philosophical Quarterly, Vol. 3 (1953 pp. 33–39. Reprinted in Theories of Ethics (ed. Philippa Foot) Oxford University Press, 1967
- "What Makes a Situation Aesthetic?" Proceedings of the Aristotelian Society, Supplementary Volumes, Vol. 31 (1957), reprinted in Aesthetics, Form and Emotion (1983)
- "Saints and Heroes", in Essays in Moral Philosophy, A. Melden (ed.), Seattle: University of Washington Press, 1958
- "Austin, John Langshaw" in J. O. Urmson, ed., The Concise Encyclopedia of Western Philosophy and Philosophers, p. 54. New York: Hawthorn Books, 1960.
- "J. L. Austin" Journal of Philosophy 1965, reprinted in The Linguistic Turn ed. Richard Rorty 1967
- "The History of Analysis" in The Linguistic Turn ed. Richard Rorty 1967
- "Utilitarianism" in The Isenberg memorial lecture series, 1965–1966 1969
- "The Objects of the Five Senses" Proceedings of the British Academy 54, 1968, 1970
- "Literature", in George Dickie and R. J. Sclafani, Aesthetics: A Critical Anthology, New York: St. Martin's Press, 1977.
- "Plato and the Poets" in Moravcsik, Julius; Temko, Philip (eds.) Plato on beauty, wisdom, and the arts 1982
- "Aristotle on Excellence of Character", New Blackfriars Volume 71 Issue 834 Page 33–37, January 1990
- "The Ethics of Musical Performance" in Michael Krausz (ed.) The Interpretation of Music (1993)

Related works

- Human Agency: Language, Duty, and Value. Philosophical Essays in Honor of J. O. Urmson ed. Jonathan Dancy, J. M. E. Moravcsik, C. C. W. Taylor, Stanford University Press, 1988, ISBN 9780804714747. Contains a bibliography of Urmson's philosophical works and an introductory essay by him.
