= Maximilian de Gaynesford =

British philosopher (born 1968)

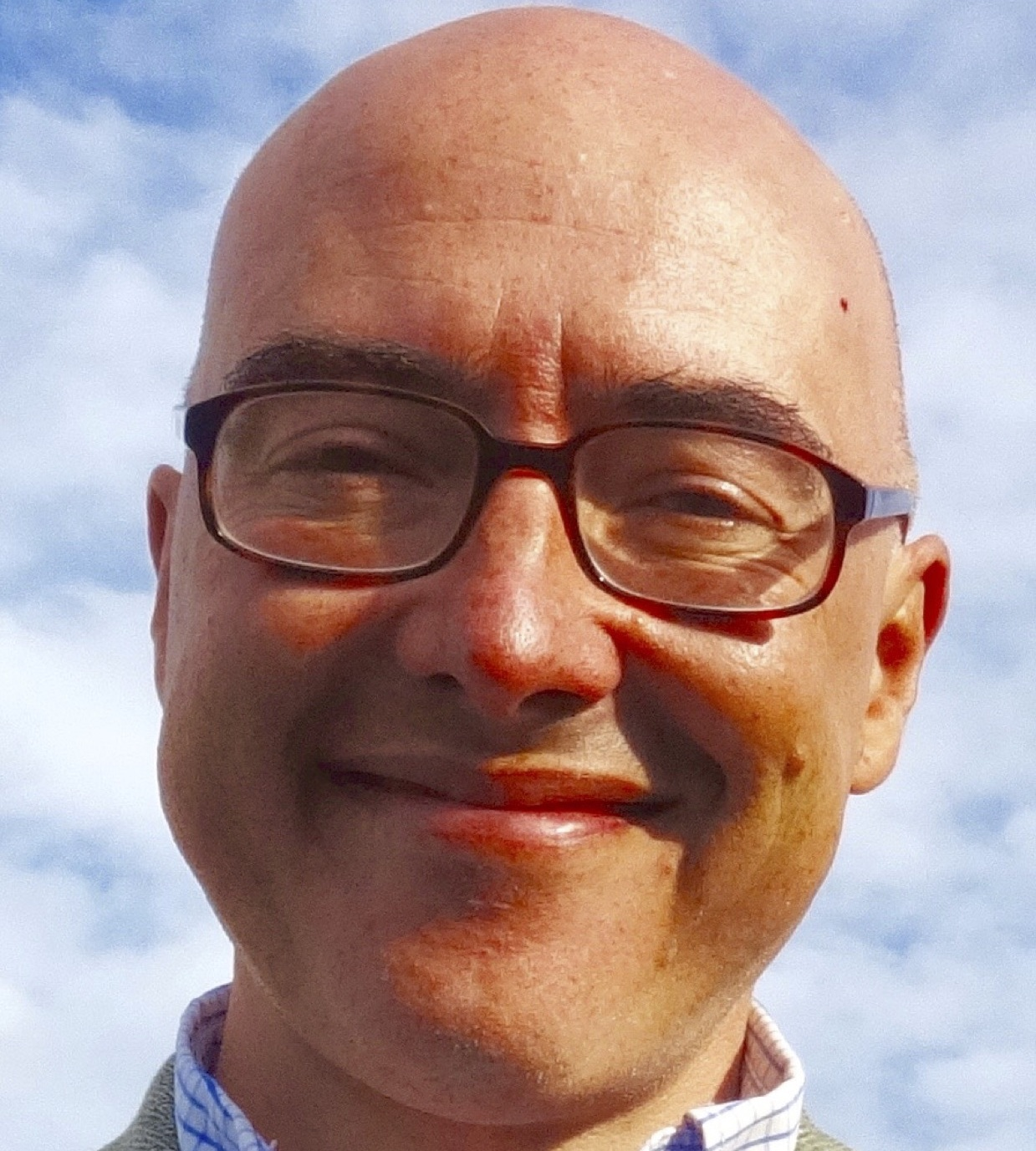
- Gaynesford in 2015
- Born: Robert Maximilian de Gaynesford; 2 January 1968 (age 58); London, England

Philosophical work
- Era: 21st-century philosophy
- Region: Western philosophy
- School: Analytic philosophy Phenomenology
- Institutions: University of Reading
- Main interests: Philosophy of language Philosophy of mind Aesthetics; Metaphysics; Epistemology; Moral psychology

Robert Maximilian de Gaynesford (born 2 January 1968) is a British philosopher and professor of philosophy at the University of Reading.

== Education and career ==
De Gaynesford attended Ampleforth College and Balliol College, Oxford (1986–1989; First in Modern History), after which he spent several years studying theology before turning to philosophy in 1993. Lincoln College, Oxford elected him fellow and tutor in philosophy in 1997, shortly before he received his doctorate. He was subsequently a Humboldt Research Fellow at the Freie Universität Berlin (2003) and a tenured professor at The College of William and Mary in Virginia (2002–2006), before becoming professor of philosophy (2008) and head of department (2016) at the University of Reading.

He has published over forty articles and five books on topics in the philosophy of language, philosophy of mind, metaphysics, and epistemology. His other research interests include moral psychology and the philosophy of law, where he has written on a category of defence he terms "justifexcuses".

== Selected bibliography ==
=== Books ===
- John McDowell (Polity, 2004)
- I: The Meaning of the First Person Term (Oxford University Press, 2006)
- Hilary Putnam (Routledge, 2006)
- The Rift in the Lute: Attuning Poetry and Philosophy (Oxford University Press, 2017)
- How to Be Radical in Philosophy (Bloomsbury Academic, 2023)

=== Chapters in books ===
- "Uptake in Action" in Interpreting J.L. Austin: Critical Essays, ed. Savas Tsohatzidis (Cambridge University Press, 2017), pp. 79–95.
- "Attuning philosophy and literary criticism" in Beyond the Ancient Quarrel: Literature, Philosophy, and J.M. Coetzee, eds P. Hayes and J. Wilm (Oxford University Press, 2017).
- "The Sonnets and Attunement" in The Routledge Companion to Shakespeare and Philosophy, eds Craig Bourne and Emily Caddick Bourne (Routledge, 2018).
