= Geoffrey Warnock =

English philosopher and Vice-Chancellor

Sir Geoffrey Warnock
- Warnock in 1973

Vice-Chancellor of the University of Oxford
- In office 1981–1985
- Chancellor: The Earl of Stockton
- Preceded by: Sir Rex Richards
- Succeeded by: The Lord Neill of Bladen

Personal details
- Born: Geoffrey James Warnock; 16 August 1923 Leeds, England
- Died: 8 October 1995 (aged 72) Axford, Wiltshire, England
- Spouse: Mary Warnock, Baroness Warnock (m. 1949)
- Children: 5
- Education: Winchester College; New College, Oxford
- Occupation: Philosopher

Sir Geoffrey James Warnock (16 August 1923 – 8 October 1995) was an English philosopher and Vice-Chancellor of Oxford University. Before his knighthood (in the 1986 New Year Honours), he was commonly known as G. J. Warnock.

== Life ==
Warnock was born at Neville House, Chapel Allerton, Leeds, West Yorkshire, to James Warnock (1880–1953), OBE, a general practitioner from Northern Ireland who had been a captain in the Royal Army Medical Corps, and Kathleen (née Hall; 1890–1979). The Warnocks later lived at Grade II-listed Pull Croft, Sutton Courtenay, Oxfordshire (historically Berkshire).

Warnock was educated at Winchester College. He then served with the Irish Guards until 1945, before entering New College, Oxford, with a deferred classics scholarship. At New College, he read for a degree in PPE, graduating with a first in 1948. His tutors during his studies included Isaiah Berlin and H. L. A. Hart.

He was elected to a fellowship at Magdalen College, Oxford, in 1949. After spending three years at Brasenose College, he returned to Magdalen as a fellow and tutor in philosophy. In 1970, he was elected to principal of Hertford College, Oxford (1971–1988), where there is now a society and student house named after him. He was also the Vice-Chancellor of the University of Oxford from 1981 to 1985.

Warnock, with co-editor J. O. Urmson, prepared for posthumous 1961 publication the Philosophical Papers of their friend, and fellow Oxford linguistic philosopher, J. L. Austin. Warnock also reconstructed Austin's Sense and Sensibilia (1962) from manuscript notes.

Warnock married Mary Wilson, a fellow philosopher of St Hugh's College, Oxford, and later Baroness Warnock, in 1949. They had two sons and three daughters. In 1987 he appeared on Bryan Magee's The Great Philosophers in an episode on Immanuel Kant.

He retired to live near Marlborough, Wiltshire, in 1988 and died of degenerative lung disease in 1995 at Axford in Wiltshire.

== Works ==
Books

- Berkeley, Penguin Books, 1953.
- English Philosophy Since 1900, 1st edition, Oxford University Press, 1958; 2nd edition, Oxford University Press, 1969.
- Contemporary Moral Philosophy (New studies in ethics), Palgrave Macmillan, 1967. ISBN 978-0333048979.
- The Object of Morality, Methuen, 1971. ISBN 0-416-13780-6.
- Morality and Language, Barnes & Noble. 1983
- J. L. Austin (The Arguments of the Philosophers), Routledge, 1989.

Papers

- Metaphysics in Logic in Proceedings of the Aristotelian Society, New Series, Vol. 51 (1950 - 1951), pp. 197-222.
- Verification and the Use of Language in Revue Internationale de Philosophie, Vol. 5, No. 17/18 (3/4) (1951), pp. 307-322
- Seeing in Proceedings of the Aristotelian Society, New Series, Vol. 55 (1954 - 1955), pp. 201-218.
- Analysis and Imagination in A.J. Ayer et al., The Revolution in Philosophy. London: Macmillan, 1956.
- J. L. Austin (with J.O. Urmson) in Mind, New Series, Vol. 70, No. 278 (Apr., 1961), pp. 256-257.
- The Primacy of Practical Reason. Proceedings of the British Academy 52, 1966 (1967).
- Saturday Mornings in Essays on J.L. Austin (1973)
- Gilbert Ryle's Editorship (1976) in Mind, Vol. 85, No. 337 (Jan., 1976), pp. 47-56.

Reviews

- Reason and Analysis by Brand Blanshard (1963) in The Philosophical Quarterly, Vol. 13, No. 53 (Oct., 1963), pp. 373-375.
- What Philosophy Is: a guide to the elements by Arthur C. Danto (1970) in Metaphilosophy, Vol. 1, No. 2 (April 1970), pp. 166-168.
- Philosophical Problems by Leonard Goddard (1979) in The Philosophical Quarterly, Vol. 29, No. 114 (Jan., 1979), pp. 83-84.

For a more complete list of Warnock's works see his PhilPapers entry.

Academic offices
Preceded by George Lindor Brown	Principal of Hertford College, Oxford; 1971–1988	Succeeded by Christopher Zeeman
Preceded by Sir Rex Richards	Vice-Chancellor of Oxford University; 1981–1985	Succeeded by Lord Neill of Bladen
