= H. H. Price =

Welsh philosopher (1899–1984)

H. H. Price FBA
- Born: Henry Habberley Price; 17 May 1899; Neath, Wales
- Died: 26 November 1984 (aged 85); Oxford, England

Education
- Education: New College, Oxford
- Academic advisor: H. A. Pritchard

Philosophical work
- Era: 20th-century philosophy
- Region: Western philosophy
- School: Analytic philosophy; critical perceptual realism; nominalism
- Institutions: New College, Oxford
- Notable students: D. M. Armstrong; Brian David Ellis
- Main interests: Philosophy of perception
- Notable ideas: Sense data theory without phenomenalism, theory of afterlife

Henry Habberley Price (17 May 1899 – 26 November 1984) was a Welsh philosopher, known for his work on the philosophy of perception. He also wrote on parapsychology.

== Biography ==
Born in Neath, Glamorganshire, Wales, Price was educated at Winchester College and New College, Oxford. He obtained first-class honours in Literae Humaniores in 1921.

He was a Fellow of Magdalen College, Oxford (1922–24), Assistant Lecturer in philosophy at the University of Liverpool (1922–23), Fellow and Tutor of Trinity College, Oxford (1924–35), Lecturer in philosophy at Oxford (1932–35) and Wykeham Professor of Logic, and Fellow of New College (1935–59). Price was president of the Aristotelian Society from 1943 to 1944. He was elected to the British Academy in 1943.

Price is perhaps best known for his work on the philosophy of perception. He argues for a sophisticated sense data account, although he rejects phenomenalism. In his book Thinking and Experience, he moves from perception to thought and argues for a dispositionalist account of conceptual cognition. Concepts are held to be a kind of intellectual capacity, manifested in perceptual contexts as recognitional capacities. For Price, concepts are not some kind of mental entity or representation. The ultimate appeal is to a species of memory distinct from event recollection.

He died in Oxford.

== Parapsychology ==
Price had written various publications on parapsychology, often advocating new concepts and theories. He was President of the Society for Psychical Research (1939–40, 1960–1)

=== Afterlife ===
Price had speculated on the nature of the afterlife and developed his own hypothesis about what the afterlife may be like. According to Price after death the self will find itself in a dream world of memories and mental images from their life. Price wrote that the hypothetical "next world would be realms of real mental images." Price however believed that the self may be able to draw upon its memories of previous physical existence to create an environment of totally new images. According to Price, the dream world will not follow the laws of physics just as ordinary dreams do not. In addition, he wrote that each person will experience a world of their own, though he also wrote that the dream world doesn't necessarily have to be solipsistic as different selves may be able to communicate with each other by dream telepathy.

=== Place memories ===
Price developed the concept of "place memories" (see Stone Tape). He proposed that hauntings could be explained by memories becoming lost from an individual's mind and then somehow attaching themselves to the environment which could be picked up by others as hallucinations. He also believed that "place memories" could explain psychometry.

=== Psychic ether ===
Linking his afterlife hypothesis with the concept of place memories Price proposed another hypothesis called the "psychic ether" hypothesis. He wrote that this hypothesis would explain where the memories would be stored for hauntings as well as for clairvoyance, ghosts and other paranormal phenomena. Price proposed that a universal psychic ether coexisting dimension exists as an intermediary between the mental and ordinary matter. According to Price the psychic ether consists of images and ideas. Price wrote that apparitions are actually memories from people and that under the right conditions they can be seen as hallucinations. Price believed that the dreamlike world of the afterlife exists in the psychic ether. According to (Ellwood, 2001) the psychic ether of Price is "a posited level of reality consisting of persisting, dynamic images created by the mind and capable of being perceived by certain persons."

=== Reception ===
Some researchers have attempted to update the afterlife hypothesis of Price. Michael Grosso (1979) in an extension of Price's theory suggested that the "ego may become fragmented in the afterlife state and when ones wish's and desires are played out may experience a transpersonal state akin to those experienced by the mystics". The psychical researcher Ralph Noyes (1998) published an article discussing the theories of Price and attempted to update them with recent finds in parapsychology. Noyes proposed that the mental world of Price is a "psychosphere" which he defined as a "vast and complex cauldron of ideas, memories, volitions, desires and all the other furniture of conscious experience and unconscious mental functioning".

The most common criticism of HH Price's afterlife hypothesis has come from the religious community as his suggestions are not consistent with traditional Christian teaching, nor the teachings of any other monotheistic religion.

== Works ==
- Perception (1932)
- Truth and Corrigibility (1936)
- Hume's Theory of the External World (1940)
- Thinking and Representation (1946) – the 1946 Hertz Philosophical Lecture at the British Academy
- Thinking and Experience (1953; second edition, 1969)
- Belief (1969) (1959–61 Gifford Lectures, online)
- Essays in the Philosophy of Religion, based on the Sarum lectures 1971 (1972)
- Philosophical Interactions with Parapsychology: The Major Writings of H. H. Price on Parapsychology and Survival (1995) edited by Frank B. Dilley
- Collected Works of Henry H. Price (1996) four volumes, edited by Martha Kneale
- Thinking and Experience, and Some Aspects of the Conflict between Science and Religion (1996) reprints

Articles

- Price, H. H. (1939). "Haunting and the 'psychic ether' hypothesis: With some preliminary reflections on the present condition and possible future of psychical research". Proceedings of the Society for Psychical Research, 45, 307–374.
- Price, H. H. (1940). "Some philosophical questions about telepathy and clairvoyance". Philosophy, 15, 363–374.
- Price, H.H. (1947). "Harold Arthur Prichard", Proceedings of the British Academy, XXXIII, 1947 [reprinted as pamphlet, 1–20]
- Price, H. H. (1948). "Psychical research and human personality". Hibbert Journal, 105–113.
- Price, H. H. (1953). "Survival and the idea of 'another world'". Proceedings of the Society for Psychical Research, 50, 1–125.
- Price, H. H. (1959). "Psychical research and human nature". Journal of Parapsychology, 23, 178–187.
- Price, H. H. (1961). "Apparitions: Two theories". Journal of Parapsychology, 24, 110–125.
