= Mary Hesse =

English philosopher of science

Mary Hesse FBA
- Born: Mary Brenda Hesse; 15 October 1924; Reigate, Surrey, England
- Died: 2 October 2016 (aged 91); Cambridge, England

Education
- Education: Imperial College; University College London
- Academic advisor: Herbert Dingle

Philosophical work
- Era: Contemporary philosophy
- Region: Western philosophy
- School: Analytic philosophy
- Institutions: University of London; University of Cambridge
- Doctoral students: Hugh Mellor
- Main interests: Philosophy of science
- Notable ideas: Analogical account of scientific models
- Website: www.collodel.org

Mary Brenda Hesse (15 October 1924 – 2 October 2016) was an English philosopher of science and a professor at the University of Cambridge.

== Biography ==
Mary Hesse was born in Reigate, Surrey, to Ethelbert (Bertie) Thomas Hesse and Brenda Hesse (née Pelling).

From 1949, she studied at Imperial College London, where she received a bachelor's degree in mathematics in 1945, followed by a PhD in electron microscopy in 1948. She earned a master's degree in 1949 from University College London. Hesse lectured on mathematics at Royal Holloway College from 1947 to 1951, and at the University of Leeds from 1951 to 1955. From 1955 to 1959 she taught philosophy and history of science at the University of London (the subject of her 1949 UCL master's degree). In 1960 she was appointed to a lectureship in the same subject at the University of Cambridge, and in 1968 to a readership. Hesse was a Fellow of Wolfson College from its beginning in 1965, and served as its vice-president from 1976 to 1980. From 1975 until her early retirement in 1985, she remained at Cambridge as Professor of Philosophy of Science. Hesse was elected a Fellow of the British Academy in 1971, as president of the Philosophy of Science Association in 1979, and awarded a Cambridge honorary ScD in 2002. Retiring in 1985, she remained living in Cambridge until her death on 2 October 2016.

== Publications ==
Monographs

- (1954) Science and the Human Imagination: Aspects of the History and Logic of Physical Science; London, England: SCM Press
- (1961) Forces and Fields: A Study of Action at a Distance in the History of Physics; London, England: Thomas Nelson and Sons
- (1963) Models and Analogies in Science; London, England: Sheed and Ward
  - (1966) revised ed.; Notre Dame, Indiana: Notre Dame University Press
- (1974) The Structure of Scientific Inference; London, England: Macmillan, and Berkeley, California: University of California Press
- (1986) with Michael A. Arbib, The Construction of Reality; Cambridge, England: Cambridge University Press

Essay collections

- (1980) Revolutions and Reconstructions in the Philosophy of Science; Brighton, England: The Harvester Press, and Bloomington, Indiana: Indiana University Press

Academic papers/book chapters, a selection

- "Gilbert and the Historians (I)", The British Journal for the Philosophy of Science, 11: 41 (May 1960), 1-10
  - "Gilbert and the Historians (II)", The British Journal for the Philosophy of Science, 11: 42 (August 1960), 130-142
- "Models and Matter" in Quanta and Reality: A Symposium, S. E. Toulmin (ed.), Hutchinson: London 1962, pp. 49–57.
- "Action at a Distance" in The Concept of Matter, E. McMullin (ed.), University of Notre Dame Press: Notre Dame (IN) 1963, pp. 372-39
- "Analogy and Confirmation Theory" Philosophy of Science, vol. 31, no. 4, 1964, pp. 319–327
- "Positivism and the Logic of Scientific Theories" in The Legacy of Logical Positivism for the Philosophy of Science, P. Achinstein and S. Barker (eds), Johns Hopkins Press: Baltimore 1969, pp. 85–114.
- "Confirmation of Laws" in Philosophy, Science and Method: Essays in Honor of Ernest Nagel, S. Morgenbesser, P. Suppes and M. White (eds), St. Martin’s Press: New York 1969, pp. 74–79.
- "An Inductive Logic of Theories" in Analyses of Theories and Methods of Physics and Psychology, Minnesota Studies in the Philosophy of Science, Vol. IV, M. Radner and S. Winokur (eds), University of Minnesota Press: Minneapolis 1970, pp. 164–80
- "Is There an Independent Observation Language?" in The Nature and Function of Scientific Theories, Robert G. Colodny (ed.), University of Pittsburgh Press: Pittsburgh 1970, pp. 35–77.
- "Hermeticism and Historiography: An Apology for the Internal History of Science" in Historical and Philosophical Perspective of Science, Minnesota Studies in the Philosophy of Science, Vol. V, R. H. Stuewer (ed.), University of Minnesota Press: Minneapolis 1970, pp. 134–160.
- "In Defence of Objectivity", Proceedings of the British Academy, Volume 58, 1974
- "Theory and Value in the Social Sciences" in Action and Interpretation: Studies in the Philosophy of the Social Sciences, C. Hookway and P. Pettit (eds), Cambridge University Press: Cambridge and New York 1978, pp. 1–16.
- "Cosmology as Myth", Concilium, 166. 1983/6: Project X - Theology and Cosmology (1983), 49-54.
- "Tropical talk: The Myth of the Literal", Proceedings of the Aristotelian Society Supplementary Volumes, 51 (1987), 297-311
- "Vico's Heroic Metaphor" in Metaphysics and Philosophy of Science in the Seventeenth and Eighteenth Centuries: Essays in Honour of Gerd Buchdahl, R. Woolhouse (ed.), Kluwer: Dordrecht and Boston 1988, pp. 185–212.
- "Is Science the New Religion?" in Science Meets Faith: Theology and Science in Conversation, F. Watts (ed.), SPCK: London 1998, pp. 120–135.

*For a complete list of publications, see the online annotated and chronological bibliographies at Matteo Collodel's website in her honour.
