= David Norbrook =

British historian

- Born: 1 June 1950 (age 76)
- Spouse: Sharon Achinstein
- Family: Peter Achinstein (father-in-law)

Academic background
- Education: Aberdeen Grammar School
- Alma mater: University of Aberdeen; Balliol College, Oxford
- Thesis: Panegyrics of the monarch and its social context under Elizabeth I and James I (1978)
- Doctoral advisor: John Buxton; Penry Williams

David Norbrook (born 1 June 1950) is an Emeritus Fellow of Merton College, Oxford. He specializes in literature, politics and historiography in the early modern period, and in early modern women's writing. He teaches in literary theory and early modern texts, in early modern women writers, and in Shakespeare, Milton and Marvell.

Norbrook was educated at Aberdeen Grammar School, the University of Aberdeen and Balliol College, Oxford. His doctoral thesis focused on Elizabethan and Jacobean monarchical panegyric and was supervised by John Buxton and Penry Williams. He became fellow and tutor in English Language and Literature at Magdalen College, Oxford from 1978 to 1998, and offered some support to the radical pressure group Oxford English Limited in the late 1980s.

He was Professor of English at the University of Maryland from 1999 to 2002. He was Merton Professor of English Literature between 2002 and 2014, and was founding Director of the Oxford Centre for Early Modern Studies.

He is the author of Poetry and Politics in the English Renaissance, Writing the English Republic: Poetry, Rhetoric and Politics, 1627-1660, and The Penguin Book of Renaissance Verse.

Norbrook is the general editor of a four-volume edition of the works of Lucy Hutchinson, a Republican chronicler of the English Civil War.

== Personal life ==
He is married to Sharon Achinstein Norbrook, Sir William Osler Professor of English at Oxford University; daughter of philosopher Peter Achinstein; and granddaughter of economist Asher Achinstein.
