= Forces and Fields =

Book by Mary B. Hesse

- First edition cover (1961)
- Author: Mary B. Hesse
- Language: English
- Subject: Physics
- Genre: Non-fiction
- Published: 1961 (Thomas Nelson), 1962 & 1970 (Greenwood Press), 1965 (Littlefield Adams & Co), 2005 (Dover Publications)
- Pages: 318
- ISBN: 978-0-837-13608-0 1962 edition
- OCLC: 1149220192

Forces and Fields: A Study of Action at a Distance in the History of Physics is a philosophy of physics book by Mary B. Hesse, originally published in 1961 by Thomas Nelson & Sons. It was subsequently published by Greenwood Press in 1962 and by Littlefield Adams & Co in 1965. The most recent edition is the reprint by Dover Publications in 2005 under the name Forces and Fields: The Concept of Action at a Distance in the History of Physics.

The book examines the science of ancient Greece, as well as the influence of antique philosophy on seventeenth-century thought. It also embraces many elements of modern physics, such as the action at a distance theory, wave-particle duality, and the uncertainty principle.

== Summary ==
Forces and Fields has eleven chapters; the first ten chapters consist of five or more sections, while the eleventh has two. The chapters are as follows:

No.	Chapter Title
I	The Logical Status of Theories
II	The Primitive Analogies
III	Mechanism in Greek Science
IV	The Greek Inheritance
V	The Corpuscular Philosophy
VI	The Theory of Gravitation
VII	Action at a Distance
VIII	The Field Theories
IX	The Theory of Relativity
X	Modern Physics
XI	The Metaphysical Framework of Physics

== See also ==
- Action at a distance
