= A. J. Ayer =

English philosopher (1910–1989)

Sir A. J. Ayer FBA
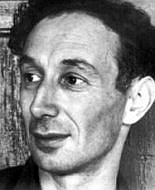
- Born: Alfred Jules Ayer; 29 October 1910; St. John's Wood, London, England
- Died: 27 June 1989 (aged 78); London, England
- Spouses: Renée Lees (m. 1932; div. 1941); Dee Wells (m. 1960; div. 1983); Vanessa Salmon (m. 1983; died 1985); Dee Wells (m. 1989; died 1989)
- Children: 4
- Awards: Knight Bachelor (1970)

Education
- Education: Christ Church, Oxford
- Academic advisor: Gilbert Ryle

Philosophical work
- Era: 20th-century philosophy
- Region: Western philosophy
- School: Analytic philosophy; Logical positivism
- Institutions: Christ Church, Oxford; Wadham College, Oxford; University College London; New College, Oxford
- Doctoral students: John Foster; A. C. Grayling
- Main interests: Philosophy of language; epistemology; ethics; theory of meaning; philosophy of science
- Notable ideas: Verification principle; emotivist ethics

Sir Alfred Jules "Freddie" Ayer (/ɛər/ AIR; 29 October 1910 – 27 June 1989) was an English philosopher who became professionally established through his exposition of major theses of logical positivism in Language, Truth, and Logic (1936). The work's dismissal of metaphysics and endorsement of emotivism was the cause of much controversy and debate.

Following his education at the University of Oxford and a period of study and discussion with Moritz Schlick and the Vienna Circle over the winter of 1932–1933, from 1933 to 1940 he lectured on philosophy at Christ Church, Oxford (his alma mater). After serving as a Special Operations Executive and MI6 agent during the Second World War, Ayer soon after became Grote Professor of the Philosophy of Mind and Logic at University College London from 1946 until 1959. He returned to Oxford to become Wykeham Professor of Logic at New College, a chair he held until his retirement in 1977/1978. He was knighted in 1970.

Ayer was known for his advocacy of humanism, and was the second president of the (then) British Humanist Association (1965–1970). He was also president of the Homosexual Law Reform Society for a time; remarking that "as a notorious heterosexual I could never be accused of feathering my own nest".

== Life ==
Ayer was born in St John's Wood, in northwest London, to Jules Louis Cyprien Ayer and Reine (née Citroen), both parents from continental Europe. His mother was from the Dutch-Jewish family that founded the Citroën car company in France; his father was a Swiss Calvinist financier who worked for the Rothschild family, including for their bank and as secretary to Alfred Rothschild.

Ayer was educated at Ascham St Vincent's School, a former boarding preparatory school for boys in the seaside town of Eastbourne in Sussex, where he started boarding at the relatively early age of seven for reasons to do with the First World War, and at Eton College, where he was a King's Scholar. At Eton, Ayer first became known for his characteristic bravado and precocity. Though primarily interested in his intellectual pursuits, he was very keen on sports, particularly rugby, and reputedly played the Eton Wall Game very well. In the final examinations at Eton, Ayer came second in his year, and first in classics. In his final year, as a member of Eton's senior council, he unsuccessfully campaigned for the abolition of corporal punishment at the school. He won a classics scholarship to Christ Church, Oxford. He graduated with a BA with first-class honours.

After graduating from Oxford, Ayer spent a year in Vienna, returned to England and published his first book, Language, Truth and Logic, in 1936. This first exposition in English of logical positivism as newly developed by the Vienna Circle, made Ayer at age 26 the enfant terrible of British philosophy. As a newly famous intellectual, he played a prominent role in the Oxford by-election campaign of 1938. Ayer campaigned first for the Labour candidate Patrick Gordon Walker, and then for the joint Labour-Liberal "Independent Progressive" candidate Sandie Lindsay, who ran on an anti-appeasement platform against the Conservative candidate, Quintin Hogg, who ran as the appeasement candidate. The by-election, held on 27 October 1938, was quite close, with Hogg winning narrowly.

In the Second World War, Ayer served as an officer in the Welsh Guards, chiefly in intelligence (Special Operations Executive (SOE) and MI6). He was commissioned as a second lieutenant into the Welsh Guards from the Officer Cadet Training Unit on 21 September 1940.

After the war, Ayer briefly returned to the University of Oxford where he became a fellow and Dean of Wadham College. He then taught philosophy at University College London from 1946 until 1959, during which time he started to appear on radio and television. He was an extrovert and social mixer who liked dancing and attending clubs in London and New York. He was also obsessed with sport: he had played rugby for Eton, and was a noted cricketer and a keen supporter of Tottenham Hotspur football team, where he was for many years a season ticket holder. For an academic, Ayer was an unusually well-connected figure in his time, with close links to 'high society' and the establishment. Presiding over Oxford high-tables, he is often described as charming, but could also be intimidating.

Ayer was married four times to three women. His first marriage was from 1932 to 1941, to (Grace Isabel) Renée, with whom he had a son – allegedly the son of Ayer's friend and colleague Stuart Hampshire – and a daughter. Renée subsequently married Hampshire. In 1960, Ayer married Alberta Constance (Dee) Wells, with whom he had one son. That marriage was dissolved in 1983, and the same year, Ayer married Vanessa Salmon, the former wife of politician Nigel Lawson. She died in 1985, and in 1989 Ayer remarried Wells, who survived him. He also had a daughter with Hollywood columnist Sheilah Graham Westbrook.

In 1950, Ayer attended the founding meeting of the Congress for Cultural Freedom in West Berlin, though he later said he went only because of the offer of a "free trip". He gave a speech on why John Stuart Mill's conceptions of liberty and freedom were still valid in the 20th century. Together with the historian Hugh Trevor-Roper, Ayer fought against Arthur Koestler and Franz Borkenau, arguing that they were far too dogmatic and extreme in their anti-communism, in fact proposing illiberal measures in the defence of liberty. Adding to the tension was the location of the congress in West Berlin, together with the fact that the Korean War began on 25 June 1950, the fourth day of the congress, giving a feeling that the world was on the brink of war.

From 1959 to his retirement in 1977/1978, Ayer held the Wykeham Chair, Professor of Logic at Oxford. He was knighted in 1970. After his retirement, Ayer taught or lectured several times in the United States, including as a visiting professor at Bard College in 1987. At a party that same year held by fashion designer Fernando Sanchez, Ayer confronted Mike Tyson, who was forcing himself upon the then little-known model Naomi Campbell. When Ayer demanded that Tyson stop, Tyson reportedly asked, "Do you know who the fuck I am? I'm the heavyweight champion of the world", to which Ayer replied, "And I am the former Wykeham Professor of Logic. We are both pre-eminent in our field. I suggest that we talk about this like rational men". Ayer and Tyson then began to talk, allowing Campbell to slip out. Gully Wells, Ayer's stepdaughter via Dee Wells, records the same event with some slight variation of detail.

Ayer was also involved in politics, including anti-Vietnam War activism, supporting the Labour Party (and later the Social Democratic Party), chairing the Campaign Against Racial Discrimination in Sport, and serving as president of the Homosexual Law Reform Society. In 1978 he was interviewed for Bryan Magee's Men of Ideas television show, where he spoke about logical positivism and its legacy, later in 1987 he appeared on Magee's The Great Philosophers in an episode centering on Frege, Russell and Modern Logic.

In 1988, a year before his death, Ayer wrote an article titled "What I saw when I was dead", describing an unusual near-death experience after his heart stopped for four minutes as he choked on smoked salmon. Of the experience, he first said that it "slightly weakened my conviction that my genuine death ... will be the end of me, though I continue to hope that it will be." A few weeks later, he revised this, saying, "what I should have said is that my experiences have weakened, not my belief that there is no life after death, but my inflexible attitude towards that belief".

He asked A. C. Ewing what he was most looking forward to in the afterlife, the immediate response being: "God will tell me whether there are synthetic a priori propositions." Ayer comments that "It says something [...] about the nature of the subject that this answer should be endearingly absurd."

Ayer died on 27 June 1989. From 1980 to 1989 he lived at 51 York Street, Marylebone, where a memorial plaque was unveiled on 19 November 1995.

== Philosophical ideas ==
In Language, Truth and Logic (1936), Ayer presents the verification principle as the only valid basis for philosophy. Unless logical or empirical verification is possible, statements like "God exists" or "charity is good" are not true or untrue but meaningless, and may thus be excluded or ignored. Religious language in particular is unverifiable and, as such, literally nonsense. He also criticises C. A. Mace's opinion that metaphysics is a form of intellectual poetry. The stance that a belief in God denotes no verifiable hypothesis is sometimes referred to as igtheism (for example, by Paul Kurtz). In later years, Ayer reiterated that he did not believe in God and began to call himself an atheist. He followed in the footsteps of Bertrand Russell by debating religion with the Jesuit scholar Frederick Copleston.

Ayer's version of emotivism divides "the ordinary system of ethics" into four classes:

1. "Propositions that express definitions of ethical terms, or judgements about the legitimacy or possibility of certain definitions"
2. "Propositions describing the phenomena of moral experience, and their causes"
3. "Exhortations to moral virtue"
4. "Actual ethical judgements"

He focuses on propositions of the first class – moral judgements – saying that those of the second class belong to science, those of the third are mere commands, and those of the fourth (which are considered normative ethics as opposed to meta-ethics) are too concrete for ethical philosophy.

Ayer argues that moral judgements cannot be translated into non-ethical, empirical terms and thus cannot be verified; in this, he agrees with ethical intuitionists. But he differs from intuitionists by discarding appeals to intuition of non-empirical moral truths as "worthless" since the intuition of one person often contradicts that of another. Instead, Ayer concludes that ethical concepts are "mere pseudo-concepts":

The presence of an ethical symbol in a proposition adds nothing to its factual content. Thus if I say to someone, 'You acted wrongly in stealing that money,' I am not stating anything more than if I had simply said, 'You stole that money.' In adding that this action is wrong, I am not making any further statement about it. I am simply evincing my moral disapproval of it. It is as if I had said, 'You stole that money,' in a peculiar tone of horror, or written it with the addition of some special exclamation marks. ... If now I generalise my previous statement and say, 'Stealing money is wrong,' I produce a sentence that has no factual meaning – that is, expresses no proposition that can be either true or false. ... I am merely expressing certain moral sentiments.

— A. J. Ayer, Language, Truth and Logic, Ch. VI. "Critique of Ethics and Theology"

Between 1945 and 1947, together with Russell and George Orwell, Ayer contributed a series of articles to Polemic, a short-lived British Magazine of Philosophy, Psychology, and Aesthetics edited by the ex-Communist Humphrey Slater.

Ayer was closely associated with the British humanist movement. He was an Honorary Associate of the Rationalist Press Association from 1947 until his death. He was elected a Foreign Honorary Member of the American Academy of Arts and Sciences in 1963. In 1965, he became the first president of the Agnostics' Adoption Society and in the same year succeeded Julian Huxley as president of the British Humanist Association, a post he held until 1970. In 1968 he edited The Humanist Outlook, a collection of essays on the meaning of humanism. He was one of the signers of the Humanist Manifesto.

== Works ==
Ayer is best known for popularising the verification principle, in particular through his presentation of it in Language, Truth, and Logic. The principle was at the time at the heart of the debates of the so-called Vienna Circle, which Ayer had visited as a young guest. Others, including the circle's leading light, Moritz Schlick, were already writing papers on the issue. Ayer's formulation was that a sentence can be meaningful only if it has verifiable empirical import; otherwise, it is either "analytical" if tautologous or "metaphysical" (i.e. meaningless, or "literally senseless"). He started to work on the book at the age of 23 and it was published when he was 26. Ayer's philosophical ideas were deeply influenced by those of the Vienna Circle and David Hume. His clear, vibrant and polemical exposition of them makes Language, Truth and Logic essential reading on the tenets of logical empiricism; the book is regarded as a classic of 20th-century analytic philosophy and is widely read in philosophy courses around the world. In it, Ayer also proposes that the distinction between a conscious man and an unconscious machine resolves itself into a distinction between "different types of perceptible behaviour", an argument that anticipates the Turing test published in 1950 to test a machine's capability to demonstrate intelligence.

Ayer wrote two books on the philosopher Bertrand Russell, Russell and Moore: The Analytic Heritage (1971) and Russell (1972). He also wrote an introductory book on the philosophy of David Hume and a short biography of Voltaire.

Ayer was a strong critic of the German philosopher Martin Heidegger. As a logical positivist, Ayer was in conflict with Heidegger's vast, overarching theories of existence. Ayer considered them completely unverifiable through empirical demonstration and logical analysis, and this sort of philosophy an unfortunate strain in modern thought. He considered Heidegger the worst example of such philosophy, which Ayer believed entirely useless. In Philosophy in the Twentieth Century, Ayer accuses Heidegger of "surprising ignorance" or "unscrupulous distortion" and "what can fairly be described as charlatanism".

In 1972–73, Ayer gave the Gifford Lectures at the University of St Andrews, later published as The Central Questions of Philosophy. In the book's preface, he defends his selection to hold the lectureship on the basis that Lord Gifford wished to promote "natural theology, in the widest sense of that term", and that non-believers are allowed to give the lectures if they are "able reverent men, true thinkers, sincere lovers of and earnest inquirers after truth". He still believed in the viewpoint he shared with the logical positivists: that large parts of what was traditionally called philosophy—including metaphysics, theology and aesthetics—were not matters that could be judged true or false, and that it was thus meaningless to discuss them.

In The Concept of a Person and Other Essays (1963), Ayer heavily criticised Wittgenstein's private language argument.

Ayer's sense-data theory in Foundations of Empirical Knowledge was famously criticised by fellow Oxonian J. L. Austin in Sense and Sensibilia, a landmark 1950s work of ordinary language philosophy. Ayer responded in the essay "Has Austin Refuted the Sense-datum Theory?", which can be found in his Metaphysics and Common Sense (1969).

== Awards ==
Ayer was awarded a knighthood as Knight Bachelor in the London Gazette on 1 January 1970.

== Collections ==
Ayer's biographer, Ben Rogers, deposited 7 boxes of research material accumulated through the writing process at University College London in 2007. The material was donated in collaboration with Ayer's family.

== Selected publications ==
- 1936, Language, Truth, and Logic, London: Gollancz., 2nd ed., with new introduction (1946) OCLC 416788667 ISBN 978-0-14-118604-7
- 1936, "Causation and free will", The Aryan Path.
- 1940, The Foundations of Empirical Knowledge, London: Macmillan. OCLC 2028651
- 1954, Philosophical Essays, London: Macmillan. (Essays on freedom, phenomenalism, basic propositions, utilitarianism, other minds, the past, ontology.) OCLC 186636305
- 1957, "The conception of probability as a logical relation", in S. Korner, ed., Observation and Interpretation in the Philosophy of Physics, New York: Dover Publications.
- 1956, The Problem of Knowledge, London: Macmillan. OCLC 557578816
- 1957, "Logical Positivism - A Debate" (with F. C. Copleston) in: Edwards, Paul, Pap, Arthur (eds.), A Modern Introduction to Philosophy; readings from classical and contemporary sources
- 1963, The Concept of a Person and Other Essays, London: Macmillan. (Essays on truth, privacy and private languages, laws of nature, the concept of a person, probability.) OCLC 3573935
- 1967, "Has Austin Refuted the Sense-Datum Theory?" Synthese vol. XVIII, pp. 117–140. (Reprinted in Ayer 1969).
- 1968, The Origins of Pragmatism, London: Macmillan. OCLC 641463982
- 1969, Metaphysics and Common Sense, London: Macmillan. (Essays on knowledge, man as a subject for science, chance, philosophy and politics, existentialism, metaphysics, and a reply to Austin on sense-data theory [Ayer 1967].) ISBN 978-0-333-10517-7
- 1971, Russell and Moore: The Analytical Heritage, London: Macmillan. OCLC 464766212
- 1972, Probability and Evidence, London: Macmillan. ISBN 978-0-333-12756-8
- 1972, Russell, London: Fontana Modern Masters. OCLC 186128708
- 1973, The Central Questions of Philosophy, London: Weidenfeld. ISBN 978-0-297-76634-6
- 1977, Part of My Life, London: Collins. ISBN 978-0-00-216017-9
- 1979, "Replies", in G. F. Macdonald, ed., Perception and Identity: Essays Presented to A. J. Ayer, With His Replies, London: Macmillan; Ithaca, N.Y.: Cornell University Press.
- 1980, Hume, Oxford: Oxford University Press
- 1982, Philosophy in the Twentieth Century, London: Weidenfeld.
- 1984, Freedom and Morality and Other Essays, Oxford: Clarendon Press.
- 1984, More of My Life, London: Collins.
- 1986, Ludwig Wittgenstein, London: Penguin.
- 1986, Voltaire, New York: Random House.
- 1988, Thomas Paine, London: Secker & Warburg.
- 1990, The Meaning of Life and Other Essays, Weidenfeld & Nicolson.
- 1991, "A Defence of Empiricism" in: Griffiths, A. Phillips (ed.), A. J. Ayer: Memorial Essays (Royal Institute of Philosophy Supplements). Cambridge University Press.
- 1992, "Intellectual Autobiography" and Replies in: Lewis Edwin Hahn (ed.), The Philosophy of A.J. Ayer (The Library of Living Philosophers Volume XXI), Open Court Publishing Co.

*For more complete publication details see "The Philosophical Works of A. J. Ayer" (1979) and "Bibliography of the writings of A.J. Ayer" (1992).

== See also ==
- A priori knowledge
- List of British philosophers

Academic offices
Preceded by John Macmurray	Grote Professor of the Philosophy of Mind and Logic; 1944–1959	Succeeded by Stuart Hampshire
Preceded by H. H. Price	Wykeham Professor of Logic; 1959–1978	Succeeded by Michael Dummett
Professional and academic associations
Preceded by John Wisdom	President of the Aristotelian Society; 1951–1952	Succeeded by H. B. Acton
Preceded by Julian Huxley	President of the British Humanist Association; 1966–1969	Succeeded by Edmund Leach
