= Lenkiewicz =

Lenkiewicz is a surname of Polish origin. Notable people with the surname include:

- Gabriel Lenkiewicz (1722–1798), Polish-Lithuanian Jesuit
- Rebecca Lenkiewicz (born 1968), English playwright
- Robert Lenkiewicz (1941–2002), English painter

== See also ==
- Wolfe von Lenkiewicz (born 1966), English artist
