= Michael R. Ayers =

British philosopher and professor emeritus (born 1935)

Michael Richard Ayers FBA (/ɛərz/; born 27 June 1935) is a British philosopher and professor emeritus of philosophy at the University of Oxford.

== Early life ==
Ayers was born in the Wandsworth district of London. He studied at St John's College, Cambridge, and was a fellow of Wadham College, Oxford, from 1965 until 2002. Among his students are Colin McGinn and William Child.

== Career ==
Ayers's research focus is in the history of philosophy and in epistemology, metaphysics, and language. He is co-editor of the Cambridge History of Seventeenth-Century Philosophy and subject editor of the Routledge Encyclopedia of Philosophy, has edited the work of George Berkeley and published on Descartes. His most influential contributions, however, concern the work of John Locke. He is the author of Locke: Epistemology and Ontology, as well as of several seminal articles on Locke's philosophy.

In 1987, Bryan Magee invited Michael Ayers to talk about Locke and Berkeley in the BBC's series The Great Philosophers.

Michael Ayers has also published on the topic of metaphysics, where he defends an ordinary objects view and natural kinds realism, and on epistemology, where his realist empiricism is based on direct realism in perception, anti-conceptualism, and anti-scepticism. His book Knowing and Seeing (OUP 2019), in which he gives a detailed account of his epistemology, was discussed in a book symposium in Grazer Philosophische Studien (2021).

He is a member of Academia Europaea and a fellow of the British Academy.

== Publications ==
- Philosophy and its Past, Jonathan Rée, Michael Ayers, Adam Westoby: Harvester Press, 1978.
- George Berkeley. Philosophical Works: Including the Works on Vision edited by Michael Ayers, 1975. New ed., revised and enlarged. London: Dent, 1985.
- Locke: Epistemology and Ontology London: Routledge, 1993. First published as two volumes, 1991.
- "The foundations of knowledge and the logic of substance: the structure of Locke's general philosophy", Locke, Vere Chappell (ed.), Oxford University Press 1998
- The Cambridge History of Seventeenth-Century Philosophy, Volume 1, edited by Daniel Garber and Michael Ayers: Cambridge University Press 1998
- "What is Realism?", Supplement to the Proceedings of the Aristotelian Society, Vol. 75, No. 1, July 2001
- "The Second Meditation and Objections to Cartesian Dualism", Christia Mercer and Eileen O'Neill (eds.), Early Modern Philosophy: Mind, Matter, and Metaphysics, Oxford University Press, 2005
- "Ordinary Objects, Ordinary Language and Identity", The Monist, Vol. 88, No. 4, October 2005
- "Substance, Reality, and the Great Dead Philosophers." American Philosophical Quarterly 7 (1970): 38–49.
  The paper is a reply to: Bennett, Jonathan (1965). "Substance, Reality, and Primary Qualities". American Philosophical Quarterly. 2: 1–17.
- "Was Berkeley an empiricist or a rationalist?". The Cambridge Companion to Berkeley, 2005. pp. 34–62.
- Knowing and Seeing: Groundwork for a New Empiricism, Oxford University Press, Oxford 2019.
- "Response to Comments and Criticisms." Grazer Philosophische Studien 98, no. 4 (2021): 600-627.
