= Penry Williams =

Penry Williams may refer to:

- Penry Williams (politician) (1866–1945), English politician
- Penry Williams (artist) (1802–1885), Welsh artist
- Penry Williams (historian) (1925–2013), Welsh historian
