= Anthony Quinton =

English political and moral philosopher, metaphysician (1925–2010)

The Right Honourable The Lord Quinton FBA
- Born: Anthony Meredith Quinton; 25 March 1925; Gillingham, Kent, England
- Died: 19 June 2010 (aged 85)
- Education: Christ Church, Oxford
- Occupation: Philosopher
- Employer: University of Oxford

Member of the House of Lords
- Lord Temporal
- Life peerage 7 February 1983 – 19 June 2010

Anthony Meredith Quinton, Baron Quinton (25 March 1925 – 19 June 2010) was an English political and moral philosopher, metaphysician, and materialist philosopher of mind. He served as President of Trinity College, Oxford from 1978 to 1987; and as chairman of the board of the British Library from 1985 to 1990. He is also remembered as a presenter of the BBC Radio programme Round Britain Quiz.

== Life ==
'Tony' Quinton (as he was called by all who knew him) was born at 5 Seaton Road, Gillingham, Kent. He was the only son of Surgeon Captain Richard Frith Quinton, Royal Navy (1889–1935) and his wife (Gwenllyan) Letitia (née Jones).

He was educated at Stowe School then went on a scholarship to Christ Church, Oxford in 1943. He read modern history for two terms before joining the RAF as a flying officer and navigator. He returned in 1946, obtaining a first-class honours degree in Philosophy, Politics and Economics in 1949. An Examination Fellow of All Souls from 1949, he became a Fellow and tutor of New College, Oxford, in 1955. He was President of Trinity College, Oxford, from 1978 to 1987.

Quinton was president of the Aristotelian Society from 1975 to 1976. He was chairman of the board of the British Library from 1985 to 1990. And he was President of the Royal Institute of Philosophy from 1991 until he stepped down in 2004.

On 7 February 1983, he was created a life peer as Baron Quinton, of Holywell in the City of Oxford and County of Oxfordshire. An admirer of Margaret Thatcher, he sat in the Lords as a Conservative.

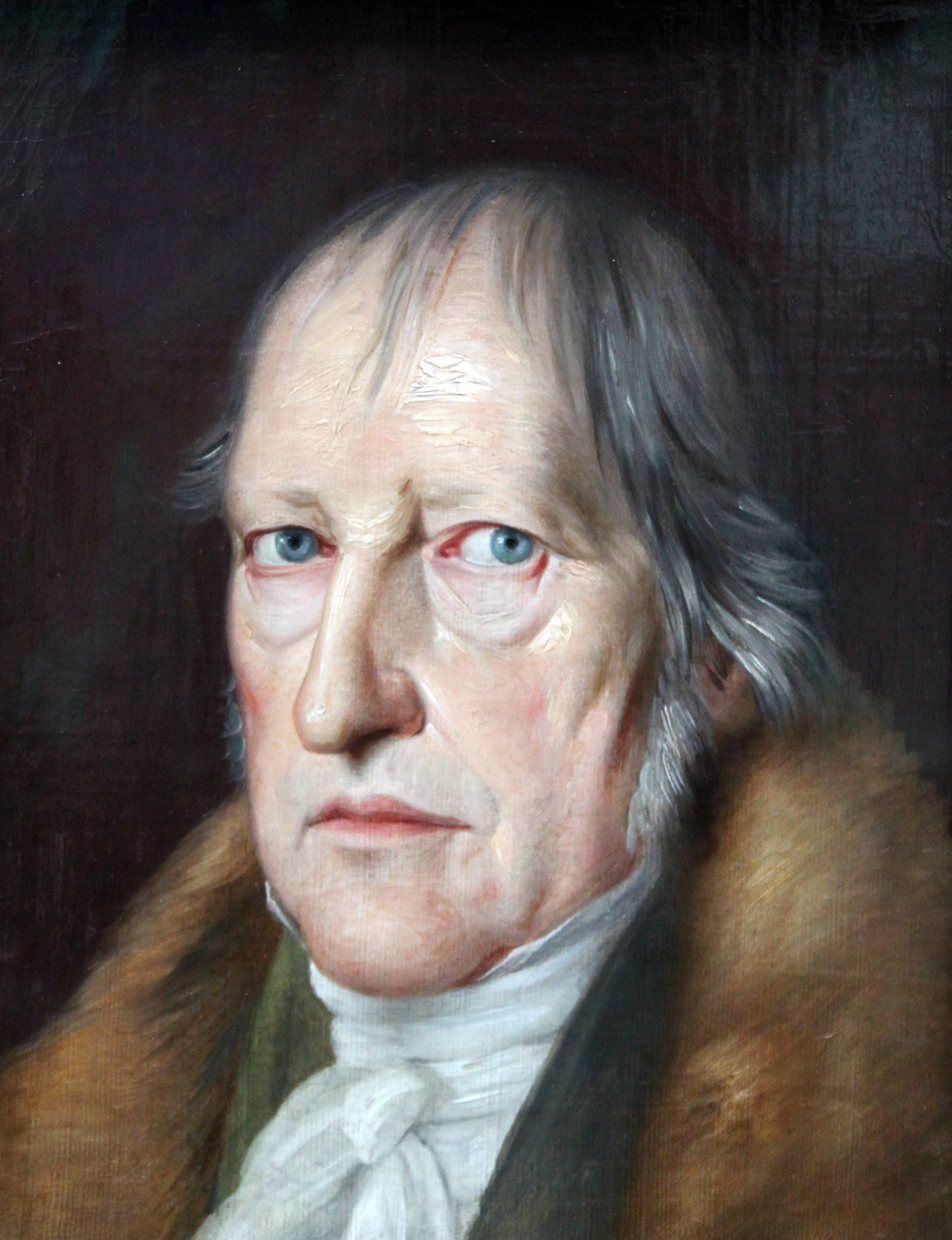
"One picture is nearly always used when occasion arises to produce one. It shows him as pale and rather flabby, with some thin hair tumbling over his forehead, his eyes looking suspiciously to his left, giving very much the impression of a bankrupt undertaker confronted by his creditors." – Quinton, "Springtime for Hegel" NYRB (2001)

To BBC Radio audiences, Quinton became well known as the presenter of the long-running Round Britain Quiz from 1974 to 1985.

Having been the guest of the introductory discussion that opened Bryan Magee's 1970-71 BBC Radio 3 series Conversations with Philosophers, and the accompanying book Modern British Philosophy (1971), he went on to participate in Magee's BBC Television series Men of Ideas (1978), in an episode dedicated to Ludwig Wittgenstein, and The Great Philosophers (1987) and their companion books.

He died on 19 June 2010.

== City of Benares tragedy ==
With the situation for civilians having worsened over the first year of World War II, Quinton's Canadian mother became persuaded by her mother's forceful urgings to return home, with her son, until the end of the war. Thus, in September 1940, Letitia Quinton booked passage for them both aboard the City of Benares due shortly to sail from Liverpool to Montreal. Departure was, however, delayed by two days on account of the need to clear German mines that had been dropped on the Mersey. Thus, when the ship did leave on 13 September it had to do so without naval escort.

At 10:03pm on 17 September, the ship was torpedoed by German submarine U-48 and began to sink. The Quintons were in the ship's lounge when the alarm bells rang. They went to their cabin to put on their life-jackets, collected their valuables, and returned to the lounge, which was their muster station. Eventually, Colonel James Baldwin-Webb, a British parliamentarian, decided they had waited long enough and took them to the lifeboats. The Quintons boarded Lifeboat 6, which, with roughly 65 people, was already overfull. As it was lowered, the falls and cables on one end snapped, sending the boat lurching forward, and tossing the majority of the passengers into the sea. Quinton was trapped by a heavy set woman, Mrs Anne Fleetwood-Hesketh: he clung to her, hoping her weight would keep them both from falling, but both fell into the sea. Quinton resurfaced and his mother pulled him back into the lifeboat. The boat now contained 23 people, two of whom had been rescued from another lifeboat, so that only 21 passengers of an original estimated 65 survived.

Through the night more passengers, including four children, died. By morning, only eight people, comprising five men, two women (including Mrs Quinton), and one child (Quinton himself) remained alive. Other lifeboats had suffered equally. HMS Hurricane rescued 105 survivors from the water, including Quinton and his mother. One lifeboat was adrift at sea for eight days before being rescued by another ship, which brought the survivor toll up to 148. Of the 406 people on board, 258 died (including 81 children). Quinton was one of 19 children to survive.

== Metaphysics ==
In the debate about philosophical universals, Quinton defended a variety of nominalism that identifies properties with a set of "natural" classes. David Malet Armstrong has been strongly critical of natural class nominalism: Armstrong believes that Quinton's 'natural' classes avoid a fairly fundamental flaw with more primitive class nominalisms, namely that it has to assume that for every class you can construct, it must then have an associated property. The problem for the class nominalist according to Armstrong is that one must come up with some criteria to determine classes that back properties and those which just contain a collection of heterogeneous objects.

Quinton's version of class nominalism asserts that determining which are the natural property classes is simply a basic fact that is not open to any further philosophical scrutiny. Armstrong argues that whatever it is which picks out the natural classes is not derived from the membership of that class, but from some fact about the particular itself.

While Quinton's theory states that no further analysis of the classes is possible, he also says that some classes may be more or less natural—that is, more or less unified than another class. Armstrong illustrates this intuitive difference Quinton is appealing to by pointing to the difference between the class of coloured objects and the class of crimson objects: the crimson object class is more unified in some intuitive sense (how is not specified) than the class of coloured objects.

In Quinton's 1957 paper, he sees his theory as a less extreme version of nominalism than that of Willard van Orman Quine, Nelson Goodman and Stuart Hampshire.

== Metaphilosophy ==
=== His "shortest definition of philosophy" ===
The shortest definition, and it is quite a good one, is that philosophy is thinking about thinking. That brings out the generally second-order character of the subject, as reflective thought about particular kinds of thinking – formation of beliefs, claims to knowledge – about the world or large parts of it. – The Oxford Companion to Philosophy, p. 666 (1st ed.)

=== His longer definition ===
Philosophy is rationally critical thinking, of a more or less systematic kind about the general nature of the world (metaphysics or theory of existence), the justification of belief (epistemology or theory of knowledge), and the conduct of life (ethics or theory of value). Each of the three elements in this list has a non-philosophical counterpart, from which it is distinguished by its explicitly rational and critical way of proceeding and by its systematic nature. Everyone has some general conception of the nature of the world in which they live and of their place in it. Metaphysics replaces the unargued assumptions embodied in such a conception with a rational and organised body of beliefs about the world as a whole. Everyone has occasion to doubt and question beliefs, their own or those of others, with more or less success and without any theory of what they are doing. Epistemology seeks by argument to make explicit the rules of correct belief formation. Everyone governs their conduct by directing it to desired or valued ends. Ethics, or moral philosophy, in its most inclusive sense, seeks to articulate, in rationally systematic form, the rules or principles involved. ibid

== Arms ==
Coat of arms of Anthony Quinton
Coronet A Coronet of a Baron Crest A Quintain proper Escutcheon Argent a Tilting Spear in bend Sable Grip Butt and Coronal Or between two Bends also Sable and in chief three Roses Gules barbed and seeded proper and in base as many Martlets also Gules Supporters Dexter: a Fox rampant proper; Sinister: a Griffin segreant per fess Azure and Or, both gorged with a Coronet Flory Or Motto Il Ose Aussi Douter (He dares also to doubt)

== Works ==
=== Books authored ===
- The Nature of Things (London, 1973)
- The Politics of Imperfection: The Religious and Secular Traditions of Conservative Thought in England from Hooker to Oakeshott (1978)
- Utilitarian Ethics (1973)
- Francis Bacon (Oxford, 1980)
- Thoughts and Thinkers (1982)
- Hume: The Great Philosophers (1997)
- From Wodehouse to Wittgenstein (1998)
- with Marcelle Quinton, Before We Met (2008)
- Of Men and Manners: Essays Historical and Philosophical (2011), Kenny, Anthony (ed.)

=== Books edited ===
- Political Philosophy. Oxford: Oxford University Press. 1967. ISBN 978-0-19-875002-4 – via internet Archive.

=== Select papers/book chapters ===
- "Spaces and Times" (1962) Philosophy. 37 (140): 130–147, reprinted in: (eds.) Le Poidevin, R., & MacBeath, M. The Philosophy of Time (1993)
- '“The ‘A Priori’ and the Analytic.” Proceedings of the Aristotelian Society, vol. 64, 1963, pp. 31–54, reprinted in: (ed.) Strawson, P. F., Philosophical logic. (1967)
- "Absolute Idealism" Proceedings of the British Academy 57, 1971 (1973)
- "Persistence of intellectual nationalism," in: Perspectives on culture and society, vol. 1 (1988), 1–22
- "Ayer's place in the history of philosophy" in: Griffiths, A. Phillips. (ed.) A.J. Ayer: Memorial Essays (1992)
- "Morals and politics" (1993) In: (ed) Griffiths, A. Phillips. .Ethics. Royal Institute of Philosophy Supplement 35,
- "Political Philosophy" (1994) in: Kenny, Anthony (ed.) The Oxford history of Western philosophy,

=== Popular writings ===
- "Springtime for Hegel," New York Review, 21 June 2001, review of Hegel: A Biography by Terry Pinkard

Academic offices
Preceded by Alexander George Ogston	President of Trinity College, Oxford; 1978–1987	Succeeded by John Burgh
