= Sidney Morgenbesser =

American philosopher (1921–2004)

- Born: September 22, 1921; New York City, U.S.
- Died: August 1, 2004 (aged 82); New York City, U.S.

Education
- Education: City College of New York (BA); Jewish Theological Seminary of America; University of Pennsylvania (MA, PhD)
- Thesis: Theories and Schemata in the Social Sciences (1956)
- Doctoral advisor: Elizabeth Flower, William Fontaine, Paul Schrecker
- Other advisor: Nelson Goodman

Philosophical work
- Era: 20th-century philosophy
- Region: Western philosophy
- School: Analytic philosophy; Pragmatism
- Institutions: Columbia University
- Main interests: Philosophy of social science; Political philosophy; Epistemology

Sidney Morgenbesser (September 22, 1921 – August 1, 2004) was an American philosopher and professor at Columbia University. He wrote little but is remembered by many for his philosophical witticisms.

== Life and career ==
Sidney Morgenbesser was born on September 22, 1921, in New York City and raised in Manhattan's Lower East Side. Morgenbesser undertook philosophical studies at the City College of New York, graduating in 1941. He then undertook rabbinic studies at the Jewish Theological Seminary of America, receiving his degree there in 1944. His Times obituarist notes that "He was ordained, lost his faith, and never tried too hard to find it again", swapping "belief for doubt rather than the certainty of atheism".

Morgenbesser then pursued graduate study in philosophy at the University of Pennsylvania. There he obtained his M.A. in 1950 and, with a thesis titled Theories and Schemata in the Social Sciences, his Ph.D. in 1956. It was also at Pennsylvania that, Morgenbesser reports, he held his first teaching job in philosophy and met Hilary Putnam as a student. He would also teach at Swarthmore College and the Graduate Faculty of Political and Social Science of The New School for Social Research.

In 1953, he came to work at the Bureau of Applied Social Research at Columbia University, joining the philosophy department in 1955. He was a Guggenheim Fellow in 1963, and by 1966 was made a full professor at Columbia. He was visiting professor at the Rockefeller University in 1967—1968 and also held visiting positions at Princeton University and the Hebrew University. In 1975 he was named the John Dewey Professor of Philosophy at Columbia, a position he held until his retirement, as emeritus, in 1991. He continued to occasionally teach as a special lecturer there until 1999.

Morgenbesser's areas of expertise included the philosophy of social science, political philosophy, epistemology, and the history of American pragmatism. He founded the Society for Philosophy and Public Affairs along with G. A. Cohen, Thomas Nagel and others.

Morgenbesser appeared in an interview by Bryan Magee on the topic of American pragmatism in 1987 as part of the series The Great Philosophers.

He died on 1 August 2004 at St. Luke's-Roosevelt Hospital Center in Manhattan at the age of 82, from complications due to ALS.

== Influence ==
Morgenbesser was known particularly for his sharp witticisms and humor which often penetrated to the heart of the philosophical issue at hand, on which account The New York Times Magazine dubbed him the "Sidewalk Socrates." According to one anecdote, when J. L. Austin claimed that, although a double negative often implies a positive meaning (e.g., "he is not unlike his sister"), there is no language in which a double positive implies a negative, Morgenbesser retorted: "Yeah, yeah." In another commonly reported story, Morgenbesser was asked by a student whether he agreed with Chairman Mao's view that a statement can be both true and false at the same time, to which Morgenbesser replied "Well, I do and I don't."

Another anecdote is given as follows by the Independent:

[An] unfortunate encounter with the police occurred when he lit up his pipe on the way out of a subway station. Morgenbesser protested to the officer who tried to stop him that the rules covered smoking in the station, not outside. The cop conceded he had a point, but said: "If I let you get away with it, I'd have to let everyone get away with it." To which Morgenbesser, in a famously misunderstood line, retorted: "Who do you think you are, Kant?" Hauled off to the precinct lock-up, Morgenbesser only won his freedom after a colleague showed up and explained the Categorical Imperative to the nonplussed boys in blue.

Morgenbesser published little and established no school, but was revered for his extraordinary intelligence and moral seriousness. He was a famously influential teacher; his former students included Jerry Fodor, Raymond Geuss, Alvin Goldman, Daniel M. Hausman, Robert Nozick, Hilary Putnam, Gideon Rosen, Mark Steiner, and Michael Stocker. In 1967, Morgenbesser signed a letter declaring his intention to refuse to pay taxes in protest against the U.S. war in Vietnam, and urging other people to also take this stand.

== Works ==
=== Books, (co-)edited ===
- (1960) with Arthur Danto [preface by Ernest Nagel], Philosophy of Science (New York).
- (1962) with James Walsh, Free Will, (Englewood Cliffs, N.J.,).ISBN 978-0385030373
- (1967) Philosophy of Science Today, US: Basic Books Inc. ISBN 9780465056835
- (1969) with Patrick Suppes and Morton White, Philosophy, Science, and Method: Essays in Honor of Ernest Nagel ISBN 9780312607258
- (1974) with Virginia Held and Thomas Nagel, Philosophy, Morality, and International Affairs: essays edited for the Society for Philosophy and Public Affairs. New York: Oxford University Press. ISBN 9780195017595.
- (1977) Dewey and His Critics: Essays from the Journal of Philosophy (New York). ISBN 9780931206009

=== Select articles, book chapters (co-)authored ===
- “The Decline of Religious Liberalism,” The Reconstructionist 19 (1953): 17–24.
- "On the Justification of Beliefs and Attitudes." The Journal of Philosophy, vol. 51, no. 20, 1954, pp. 565–576
- "Character and Free Will," with Arthur Danto, The Journal of Philosophy, Vol. 54, No. 16 (Aug. 1, 1957), pp. 493–505
- "Approaches to Ethical Objectivity," Educational Theory 7 (1957): 180–86.
- “Social Inquiry and Moral Judgement,” in Philosophy and Education, ed. Israel Scheffler (1958): 180–200.
- “Role and Status of Anthropological Theories,” Science 128 (1958): 72–9.
- "A Comment on Toulmin," in Dimensions Of Mind: A Symposium ed. Sidney Hook (1960)
- "Goodman on the Ravens". The Journal of Philosophy. 59 (18): 493–495. (1962), reprinted in The Philosophy of Nelson Goodman: Selected Essays (1997)
- “The Deductive Model and Its Qualifications,” in Induction: Some Current Issues, ed. Henry Kyburg and Ernest Nagel (1963), pp. 169–80.
- “Perception: Cause and Achievement,” in Boston Studies in the Philosophy of Science, ed. Marx Wartofsky (1963), pp. 206–12.
- "Belief and Disposition," with Isaac Levi American Philosophical Quarterly, vol. 1, no. 3, 1964, pp. 221–232. reprinted in Dispositions (1978)
- “Is It Science?” Social Research 33 (1966): 255–71.
- “The Realist-instrumentalist Controversy,” in Philosophy, Science and Method: Essays in Honor of Ernest Nagel (1969), pp. 200–18.
- “Imperialism: Some Preliminary Distinctions,” Philosophy & Public Affairs 3 (1973): 3–44. Reprinted in Philosophy, Morality, and International Affairs (1974)
- “Experimentation and Consent: A Note,” in Philosophical Medical Ethics: Its Nature and Significance ed. Stuart Spicker and H. Tristam Engelhardt (1977), 97–110.
- “Picking and Choosing,” with E. Ullman-Marglit, Social Research 44 (1977): 757–85.
- “The Questions of Isaiah Berlin,” with Jonathan Lieberson, New York Review of Books 27 no.3 (1980)
- "The Choices of Isaiah Berlin". with Jonathan Lieberson, The New York Review of Books 27, no.4. (1980)

For a more complete record of publications see "Sidney Morgenbesser: A Bibliography" in the below.

Festschrift

- How Many Questions?: Essays in Honour of Sidney Morgenbesser, (eds.) Leigh S. Cauman, Isaac Levi, Charles D. Parsons and Robert Schwartz (1983)
