= Dee Wells =

American journalist, novelist and broadcaster (1925–2003)

Lady Ayer
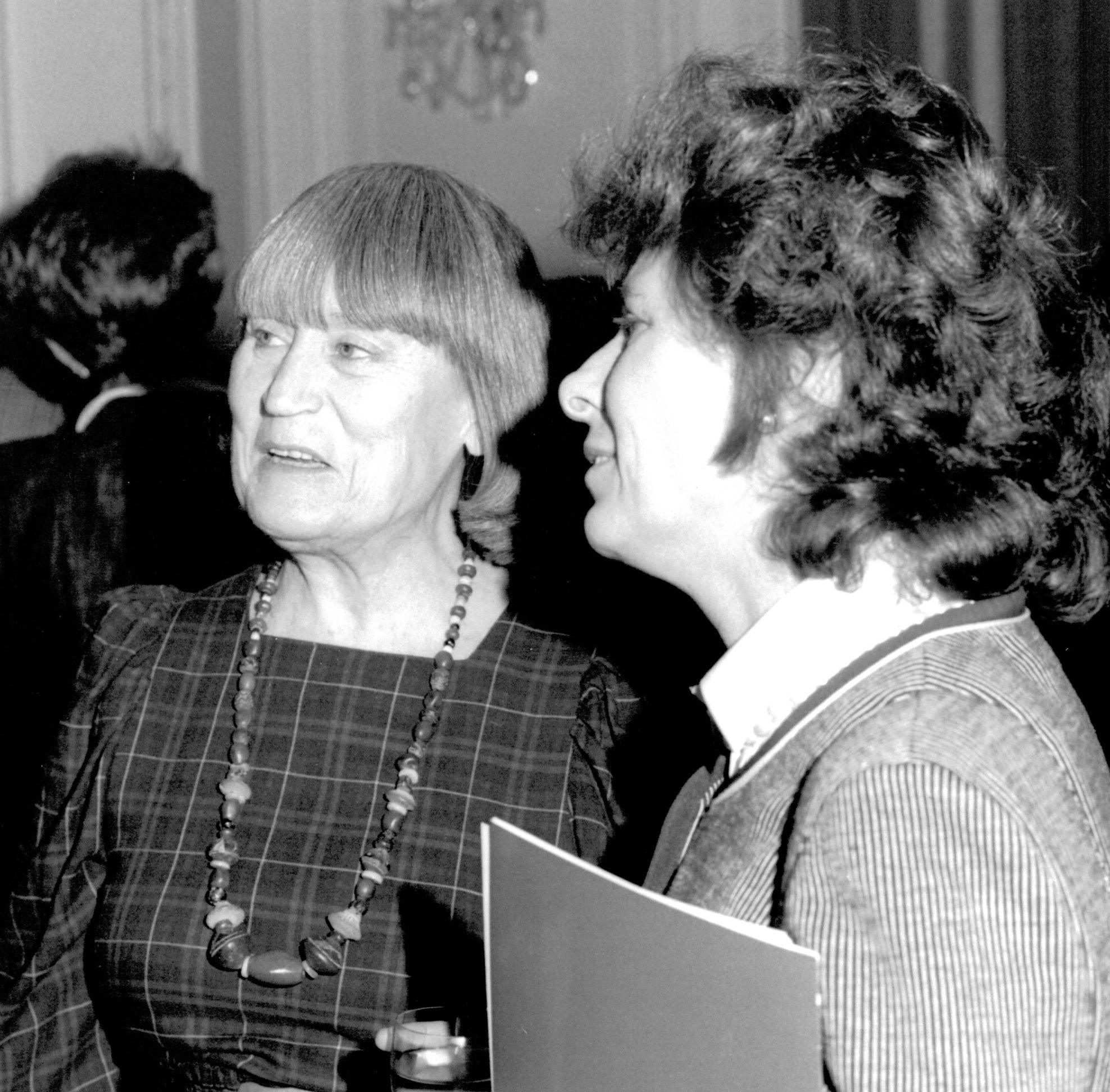
- At a party (left) following her appearance on television programme After Dark in 1989
- Born: Alberta Constance Chapman; 19 March 1925; Providence, Rhode Island
- Died: 24 June 2003 (aged 78)
- Known for: Journalist, novelist, broadcaster
- Spouses: Alfred Wells (divorced); A. J. Ayer (m. 1960; div. 1983); (m. 1989; died 1989)
- Children: 2

Alberta Constance Wells, also known as Alberta Chapman, Dee Wells, Alberta Constance Ayer, Lady Ayer (19 March 1925 – 24 June 2003), was an American journalist, novelist, and broadcaster.

== Life ==
Alberta Constance Chapman was born in Providence, Rhode Island in 1925. She served in the Canadian Army before marrying a diplomat named Al Wells. They married in Paris where she had been working at the US embassy. They spent two years in Burma before the marriage ended amicably. The daughter from this marriage was Gully Wells, who became a writer.

She met the academic A. J. Ayer (Freddie Ayer) in 1956, and despite his infidelity she married him in 1960. At this time she had been the books editor of the Daily Express for two years. During the 1960s she was frequently on TV including as a regular on Three After Six. The three in question were Benny Green, Alan Brien and herself. The programme would discuss the news and current affairs. In 1965, the head of ITV had to apologise to the police after her suggestion that they might let an art thief "fall down some stairs". She wrote her forthright opinions for The Sun newspaper during the 1960s.

In 1973, her own novel Jane was published. It sold two million copies as it described the affairs of the eponymous heroine. She and her husband took up different interests and this included different partners. She moved to New York with a designer named Hylan Booker, whilst her former husband married Vanessa Lawson.

In 1989, she remarried Ayer; he died shortly afterwards. She died in 2003. She was survived by two children, a daughter by Al Wells and a son by A. J. Ayer.
