= Jill Tweedie =

British journalist (1936–1993)

- Tweedie in 1972
- Born: Jill Sheila Tweedie; 22 May 1936; Cairo, Egypt
- Died: 12 November 1993 (aged 57); London, England
- Occupations: Writer, journalist, broadcaster
- Spouse(s): Bela Cziraky (m. 1954); Robert d'Ancona (m. 1963); Alan Brien (m. 1973)
- Children: 3
- Writing career
- Language: English

Jill Sheila Tweedie (22 May 1936 – 12 November 1993) was a British feminist, writer and broadcaster.

== Biography ==
She was educated at the independent Croydon High School in Croydon, South London. She wrote a column in The Guardian on feminist issues (1969–1988), "Letters from a faint-hearted feminist", and an autobiography entitled Eating Children (1993). She succeeded Mary Stott as a principal columnist on The Guardian's women's page.

Her light style and left-leaning politics captured the spirit of British feminism in the 1970s and 1980s. In November 2005 she was one of only five women included in the Press Gazette's 40-strong gallery of most influential British journalists.

She was married three times, to the Hungarian Count Bela Cziraky, to Bob d'Ancona, and lastly, to journalist Alan Brien, her partner until her death from motor neurone disease in 1993.

She is commemorated in a group portrait at the National Portrait Gallery with fellow Guardian Women's Page contributors Mary Stott, Polly Toynbee, Posy Simmonds and Liz Forgan.

In October 2024, Polly Toynbee claimed in an op-ed for The Guardian in support of assisted suicide that Tweedie had taken her own life, rather than having died from motor neurone disease, as previously thought.
