= The Great Philosophers =

Television series

The Great Philosophers is a 1987 BBC television series presented by Bryan Magee. There were 15 episodes, in each of which Magee interviewed a noted philosopher.

== Overview ==
In this series, Magee discussed the major historical figures of Western philosophy with fifteen contemporary philosophers. The series covered the philosophies of Plato, Aristotle, and Descartes, among others, ending with a discussion with John Searle on the philosophy of Wittgenstein. Extensively revised versions of the dialogues of The Great Philosophers are available in a book of the same name. DVDs of, and streaming rights to, the series are sold to academic institutions and episodes are available to stream to those with access to the Alexander Street academic database. The series premiered on BBC Two in September 1987 (being aired on Sunday nights), was repeated on BBC Four in October and November 2025, and also made available (within the UK) on iPlayer. The theme played over the opening credits comes from the third movement of Dmitri Shostakovich's Symphony No. 8.

== Guests ==
1. Myles Burnyeat on Plato
2. Martha Nussbaum on Aristotle
3. Anthony Kenny on Medieval Philosophy
4. Bernard Williams on Descartes
5. Anthony Quinton on Spinoza and Leibniz
6. Michael R. Ayers on Locke and Berkeley
7. John Passmore on Hume
8. Geoffrey Warnock on Kant
9. Peter Singer on Hegel and Marx
10. Frederick Copleston on Schopenhauer
11. J. P. Stern on Nietzsche
12. Hubert Dreyfus on Husserl, Heidegger and Modern Existentialism
13. Sidney Morgenbesser on The American Pragmatists
14. A. J. Ayer on Frege, Russell and Modern Logic
15. John Searle on Wittgenstein

== See also ==
- Men of Ideas, a 1978 show by Magee
