= Men of Ideas =

1978 television series

Men of Ideas is a 1978 BBC television series presented by Bryan Magee. There were 15 episodes, in which Magee interviewed noted philosophers.

== Overview ==
The first episode, "Introduction to Philosophy", saw Magee in discussion with Isaiah Berlin. In subsequent episodes Magee discussed such topics as Marxist philosophy, the Frankfurt School, and modern Existentialism. It was broadcast on BBC 2 on Thursday nights (and repeated on Saturday afternoons), between 19th January and 29th April.

During the broadcast run, edited shorter versions of the discussions were published in The Listener magazine. Extensively revised versions of the dialogues within the Men of Ideas series were published in a 1979 book of the same name, now published under the title Talking Philosophy. DVDs of the series are sold to academic institutions with the title Contemporary Philosophy.

Noting that the series "attracted a steady one million viewers per show", The Daily Telegraph hailed the series, and its 1987 'sequel', for achieving "the near-impossible feat of presenting to a mass audience recondite issues of philosophy without compromising intellectual integrity or losing ratings."

Neither this series nor The Great Philosophers, a similar BBC television series presented by Magee in 1987, are available for purchase by home users. Since March 2023, however, all episodes have been made freely available on YouTube. The theme played over the opening credits comes from the overture to Gabriel Fauré's Masques et Bergamasques.

== Episodes ==
1. "An Introduction to Philosophy", with Isaiah Berlin
2. "Marxist Philosophy", with Charles Taylor
3. "Marcuse and the Frankfurt School", with Herbert Marcuse
4. "Martin Heidegger and Modern Existentialism", with William Barrett
5. "The Two Philosophies of Wittgenstein", with Anthony Quinton
6. "Logical Positivism and its Legacy", with A. J. Ayer
7. "The Spell of Linguistic Philosophy", with Bernard Williams
8. "Moral Philosophy", with R. M. Hare
9. "The Ideas of Quine", with Willard Van Orman Quine
10. "The Philosophy of Language", with John Searle
11. "The Ideas of Chomsky", with Noam Chomsky
12. "The Philosophy of Science", with Hilary Putnam
13. "Philosophy and Politics", with Ronald Dworkin
14. "Philosophy and Literature", with Iris Murdoch
15. "Philosophy: The Social Context", with Ernest Gellner
