= Helen Longino =

American philosopher of science and feminist epistemology

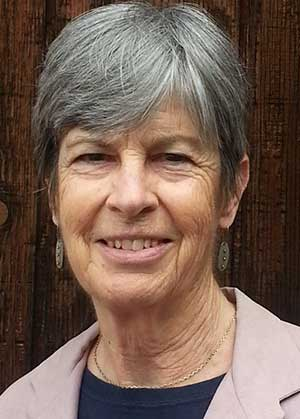
- Born: Helen Elizabeth Longino; July 13, 1944 (age 82)

Education
- Education: Barnard College (BA); University of Sussex (MA); Johns Hopkins University (PhD)
- Doctoral advisor: Peter Achinstein

Philosophical work
- Era: Contemporary philosophy
- Region: Western philosophy
- School: Analytic philosophy
- Institutions: Mills College, Rice University, University of Minnesota, Stanford University
- Main interests: Feminist theory, philosophy of science, philosophy of biology, social epistemology, feminist epistemology

External videos
- "Helen Longino: Perspectives and Pluralities", Rotman Institute of Philosophy

Helen Elizabeth Longino (born July 13, 1944) is an American philosopher of science who has argued for the significance of values and social interactions to scientific inquiry. She has written about the role of women in science and is a central figure in feminist epistemology and social epistemology. She is the Clarence Irving Lewis Professor of Philosophy, Emerita, at Stanford University. In 2016, she was elected to the American Academy of Arts and Sciences.

== Education and career ==
Longino received her B.A. in English literature from Barnard College in 1966 and her M.A. in philosophy from the University of Sussex, England, in 1967. She earned her PhD from Johns Hopkins University in Baltimore, Maryland in 1973, under the supervision of Peter Achinstein. Her dissertation dealt with Inference and Scientific Discovery.

Longino taught at the University of California, San Diego (1973–1975), Mills College (1975–1990), Rice University (1990–1995), and the University of Minnesota (1995–2005) before joining the philosophy department of Stanford University. She was active in the women's liberation movement and in establishing women's studies in several institutions. She became the Clarence Irving Lewis Professor of Philosophy in 2008 and served as chair of the philosophy department from 2008 to 2011.

Longino served as president of the Philosophy of Science Association (2013–2014), and is the First Vice President of the Division of Logic, Methodology and Philosophy of Science and Technology of the International Union of History and Philosophy of Science (2016–2019).

== Philosophical work ==
In her work, Longino discusses the social dimensions of scientific knowledge and the relations of social and cognitive values. She examines feminist and social epistemologies and their implications for scientific pluralism. Rather than suggesting that there is a distinctively female way of knowing, Longino emphasizes the idea of "doing epistemology as a feminist", an approach bringing with it an awareness of the many ways in which a question may be characterized.

In her first book, Science as Social Knowledge (1990), Longino argued for the relevance of social values, or values which are part of the human context of science, to the justification of scientific knowledge as objective. In her contextual empiricism, she argues that observations and data of the sort taken by scientists are not by themselves evidence for or against any particular hypotheses. Rather, the relevance of any particular data for any given hypothesis is decided by human beliefs and assumptions about what kinds of data can support what kinds of hypotheses. Moreover, even when the relevance of evidence is decided, there remains a logical gap between evidence and full justification of interesting scientific theories (the traditional philosophical problem of underdetermination of theories). This gap, too, must be bridged by beliefs and assumptions about legitimate reasoning in order for evidence to help us decide which hypotheses to accept as true.

Fortunately, the use of diverse perspectives to criticize hypotheses can turn some of those hypotheses into scientific knowledge. Hypotheses become knowledge when they are subjected to scrutiny from diverse perspectives, especially by those with diverse beliefs and values. In contrast to those philosophers who would point to the two evidential gaps above to argue that science is not objective therefore, Longino argues that scrutiny by those with diverse values can instead support the objectivity of science. Accordingly, our values which do not immediately seem to have anything to do with science are crucial to the objectivity of pieces of scientific knowledge, and science can be objective precisely because it is not value-free. From this viewpoint, dissent is important in testing the adequacy of our grounds for accepting a theory. Open critical dialogue within a community can potentially enable the community to overcome bias. To attain objectivity, science must permit and engage with "transformative criticism".

Longino (1990, 2001) has developed most fully a conception of objectivity based on democratic discussion. Her key idea is that the production of knowledge is a social enterprise, secured through the critical and cooperative interactions of inquirers. The products of this social enterprise are more objective, the more responsive they are to criticism from all points of view.

— Elizabeth Anderson, 2015

Longino's book The Fate of Knowledge (2002) explores and attempts to reconcile the accounts of knowledge of philosophers and sociologists of science.

Most recently, in Studying Human Behavior: How Scientists Investigate Aggression and Sexuality (2013), Longino examines five scientific approaches to human aggression and sexuality in terms of their epistemological frameworks, the types of knowledge that they produce, and their pragmatic goals. She argues that different approaches begin from and build upon different causes, each of them producing partial knowledge about the subject. As such, they cannot be reduced to a single perspective. From her perspective in social epistemology, Longino argues that scientific research will be more useful as a guide to public policy makers if the plurality of different approaches to knowledge is acknowledged. Increasing awareness of the range of perspectives to be examined can benefit policy by more thoroughly informing decisions, and also encourage caution about too quickly adopting policy positions based on a limited perspective.

Though her work on the nature of scientific knowledge is broadly feminist in the sense that it argues for the value of contributions by diverse people (and accordingly the value of the contributions of women) to science, some of Longino's other work has been more explicitly feminist and concerned with women. For example, she has presented and analyzed alternative narratives of female and male-centered accounts of human evolution, emphasizing the impact of gender-centered assumptions on the formation of theory.

Thus, conventional scientific work on the history of human evolution tends to prioritise the activities of males even though (according to Longino and to Hubbard) there is nothing in the data or in established theory which means that the evolutionary changes are any more likely to be attributable to males than females. ... therefore we do have plausible evidence that the construction of scientific knowledge at the forefront of research ... has been influenced by gendered assumptions.

— Steven Yearly, 2005

Beyond the study of knowledge, her writing has included the analysis of the nature of pornography and the circumstances under which it is morally problematic.

== Awards and honors ==
In 2002, Longino's book The Fate of Knowledge (2001) received the Robert K. Merton Professional Award for best book from the Section for Science, Knowledge, and Technology of the American Sociological Association.

In 2014, Longino's book Studying Human Behavior (2013) was awarded the Best Book in Feminist Philosophy Prize for 2014 by the Women's Caucus of the Philosophy of Science Association.

In 2016 Helen Longino was elected to the American Academy of Arts and Sciences. She was elected as a fellow of the American Association for the Advancement of Science in 2018.

== Bibliography ==
=== Books ===
- Longino, Helen E. 1990. Science as Social Knowledge: Values and Objectivity in Scientific Inquiry. Princeton: Princeton University Press. ISBN 0-691-02051-5
- Longino, Helen E. 2002. The Fate of Knowledge. Princeton: Princeton University Press. ISBN 0-691-08876-4
- Longino, Helen E. 2013. Studying Human Behavior: How Scientists Investigate Aggression and Sexuality, Chicago: University of Chicago Press.

=== Chapters in books ===
- Longino, Helen E. 1992. Essential Tensions—Phase Two: Feminist, Philosophical, and Social Studies of Science. in Ernan McMullin, editor. The Social Dimensions of Scientific Knowledge. Notre Dame: University of Notre Dame Press.
- Longino, Helen. 1993. Subjects, Power and Knowledge: Description and Prescription. in Feminist Philosophies of Science in Feminist Epistemologies, Alcoff, Linda (Ed). New York: Routledge.
- Longino, Helen E. 1994. The Fate of Knowledge in Social Theories of Science. in Frederic Schmitt, editor. Socializing Epistemology: Rowman & Littlefield.
- Longino, Helen E. 1996. Cognitive and Non-Cognitive Values in Science: Rethinking the Dichotomy. in Lynn Hankinson Nelson and Jack Nelson, editors. Feminism, Science, and the Philosophy of Science. Dordrecht: Kluwer Academic.
- Longino, Helen E. 1997. Explanation V. Interpretation in the Critique of Science. Science in Context 10.
- Longino, Helen E. 2000. Toward an Epistemology for Biological Pluralism. in Richard Creath and Jane Maienschein, editors. Biology and Epistemology. Cambridge: Cambridge Univ. Press.
- Longino, Helen E. 2002. Behavior as Affliction: Common Frameworks of Behavior Genetics and Its Rivals. in Rachel Ankeny and Lisa Parker, editors. Mutating Concepts, Evolving Disciplines: Genetics, Medicine, and Society. Boston: Kluwer Academic.
- Longino, Helen E. 2003. Does the Structure of Scientific Revolutions Permit a Feminist Revolution in Science? in Thomas Nickles, editor. Thomas Kuhn. Cambridge: Cambridge University Press.
- Longino, Helen E. 2004. How Values Can Be Good for Science. in Peter Machamer, editor. Science, Values, and Objectivity. Pittsburgh: Univ of Pittsburgh Press.
- Longino, Helen E. (2005), "Can there be a feminist science?", in Cudd, Ann E.; Andreasen, Robin O. (eds.), Feminist theory: a philosophical anthology, Oxford, UK Malden, Massachusetts: Blackwell Publishing, pp. 210–217, ISBN 978-1-4051-1661-9.

=== Journal articles ===
- Longino, Helen E (1992). "Knowledge, Bodies, and Values: Reproductive Technologies and Their Scientific Context". Inquiry. 35 (3–4): 323–340. doi:10.1080/00201749208602297.
- Longino, Helen E (1992). "Taking Gender Seriously in Philosophy of Science". Proceedings of the Biennial Meeting of the Philosophy of Science Association. 1992 (2): 333–340. doi:10.1086/psaprocbienmeetp.1992.2.192847. S2CID 55569990.
- Longino, Helen E (1994). "Gender, Sexuality Research, and the Flight from Complexity". Metaphilosophy. 25 (4): 285–292. doi:10.1111/j.1467-9973.1994.tb00488.x.
- Longino, Helen E. 1997. Feminist Epistemology as a Local Epistemology. Proceedings of the Aristotelian Society Supplement.
- Longino, Helen E (2001). "What Do We Measure When We Measure Aggression?". Studies in History and Philosophy of Science. 32A (4): 685–704. Bibcode:2001SHPSA..32..685L. doi:10.1016/S0039-3681(01)00020-6.
- Longino, Helen E (2002). "Reply to Philip Kitcher". Philosophy of Science. 69 (4): 573–577. doi:10.1086/344620. S2CID 124828082.
- Longino, Helen E (2002). "Science and the Common Good: Thoughts on Philip Kitcher's Science, Truth, and Democracy". Philosophy of Science. 69 (4): 560–568. doi:10.1086/344618. S2CID 2745822.
- Longino, Helen E (2013). "The Social Life of Scientific Theories: A Case Study from Behavioral Sciences". Biological Theory. 7 (4): 390–400. doi:10.1007/s13752-012-0053-3.
- Longino, Helen E (2016). "Foregrounding the Background". Philosophy of Science. 83 (5): 647–661. doi:10.1086/687990.
- Longino, Helen E (2020). "Interaction: a case for ontological pluralism" (PDF). Interdisciplinary Science Reviews. 45 (3): 432–445. Bibcode:2020ISRv...45..432L. doi:10.1080/03080188.2020.1794385.
- Longino, Helen E (2021). "Scaling up; scaling down: What's missing?". Synthese. 198 (4): 2849–2863. doi:10.1007/s11229-019-02249-y.
