= Contextual empiricism =

Contextual empiricism is a theory about validating scientific knowledge. It is the view that scientific knowledge is shaped by contextual values as well as constitutive ones. The contextual values of science stem from « the social and cultural environment in which science is done » while constitutive values determine « what constitutes acceptable scientific practice or scientific method. » Contextual values can determine for example the research topic one chose to study.

== See also ==
- Scientific theory
- Helen Longino
