= Lenin (novel) =

1987 novel by Alan Brien

- First edition (UK)
- Author: Alan Brien
- Language: English
- Genre: Historical novel
- Publisher: Secker & Warburg (UK); William Morrow (US)
- Publication date: 1987
- Publication place: United Kingdom
- Media type: Print (Hardback & Paperback)
- ISBN: 0-688-07944-X
- OCLC: 17481803
- Dewey Decimal: 823/.914 19
- LC Class: PR6052.R44315 L4 1987

Lenin The Novel is a fictional diary of Vladimir Ilyich Ulyanov (better known as Lenin) written by the British journalist Alan Brien and published in 1987. It follows the life of Lenin from the death of his father in early 1886 to shortly before his own demise in 1924.
