= Alan Brien =

English journalist and novelist (1925–2008)

Alan Brien (12 March 1925 – 23 May 2008) was an English journalist best known for his novel Lenin. This took the form of a fictional diary charting Vladimir Lenin's life from the death of his father to shortly before his own demise in 1924.

== Biography ==
Brien was born in Sunderland and educated at Bede Grammar School, and Jesus College, Oxford. He served in the Royal Air Force during World War II.

During his career in journalism, Brien worked as a theatre and film critic, columnist and foreign correspondent for a variety of publications, most notably The Sunday Times, Punch, the New Statesman and The Observer. During the 1960s he appeared on TV as a regular on "Three After Six". The three in question were Benny Green, Dee Wells and Brien. The programme would discuss the day's news and current affairs.

== Personal life and death ==
Brien died on 23 May 2008, survived by his fourth wife, the writer Jane Hill, with whom he had shared an ancient cottage in Highgate Village. His earlier wives included the British journalist and feminist writer Jill Tweedie.
