= Wolfe von Lenkiewicz =

British artist

Wolfe von Lenkiewicz (Von Wolfe)
- Born: Dartmoor, England
- Notable work: London, United Kingdom

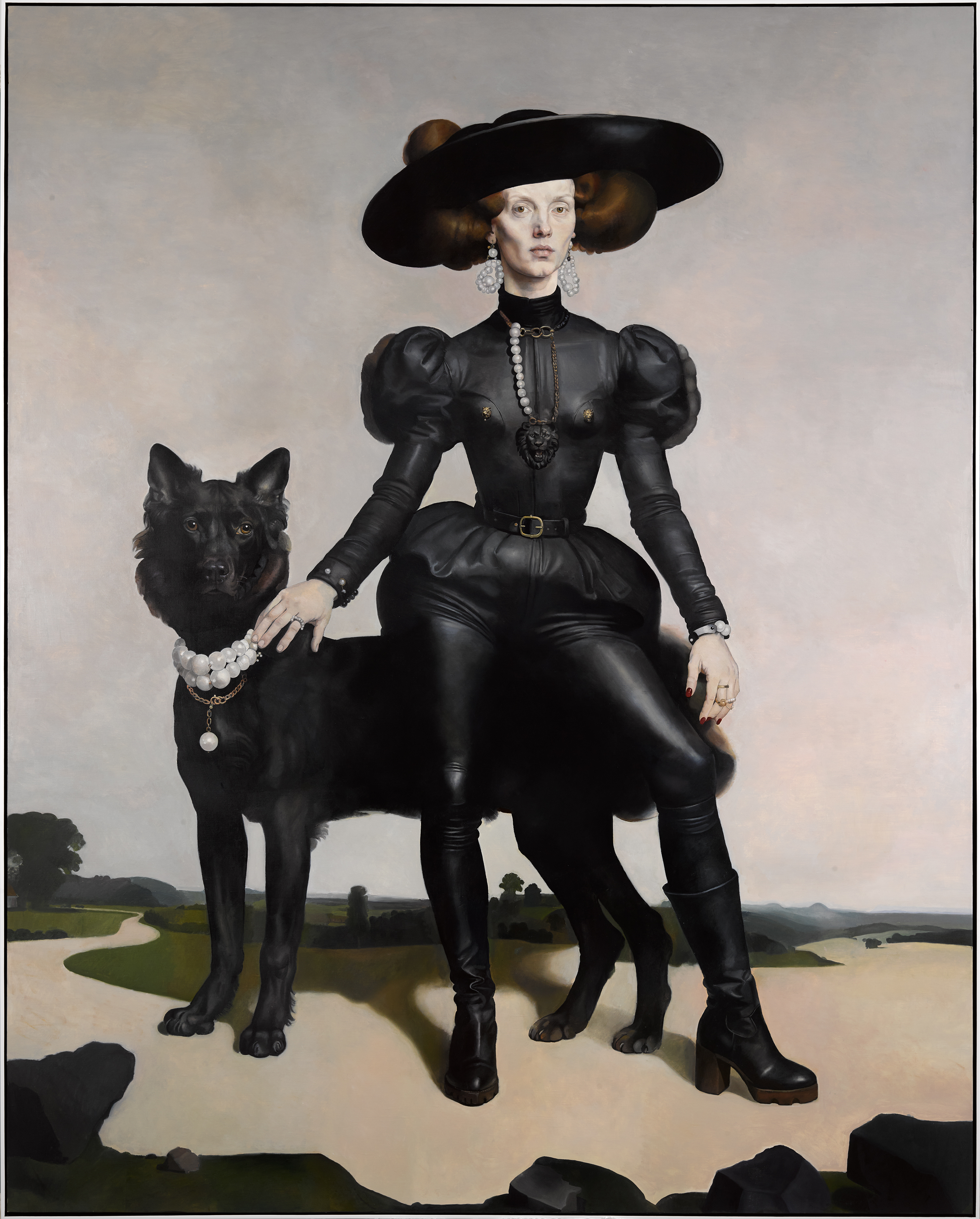
Ebon, 2024, Oil on canvas

Wolfe von Lenkiewicz is a British artist known for his artistic reconfigurations of well-known imageries from art history and visual culture to create ambiguous compositions that question art historical discourses. He lives and works in London.

== Early life and education ==
Wolfe von Lenkiewicz was born in Dartmoor, England, in October 1966 to Celia Norman and the British painter Robert Lenkiewicz. He is of German-Polish-Jewish descent, with his great-grandfather being Baron von Schlossberg, court painter to King Ludwig II of Bavaria. Lenkiewicz was educated at University of York, graduating in 1989 with a degree in Philosophy.

Lenkiewicz studied contemporary epistemology under Marie McGinn, who is now the emeritus professor of philosophy York University. He was also tutored by Roger Woolhouse on John Locke.

== Artistic career ==
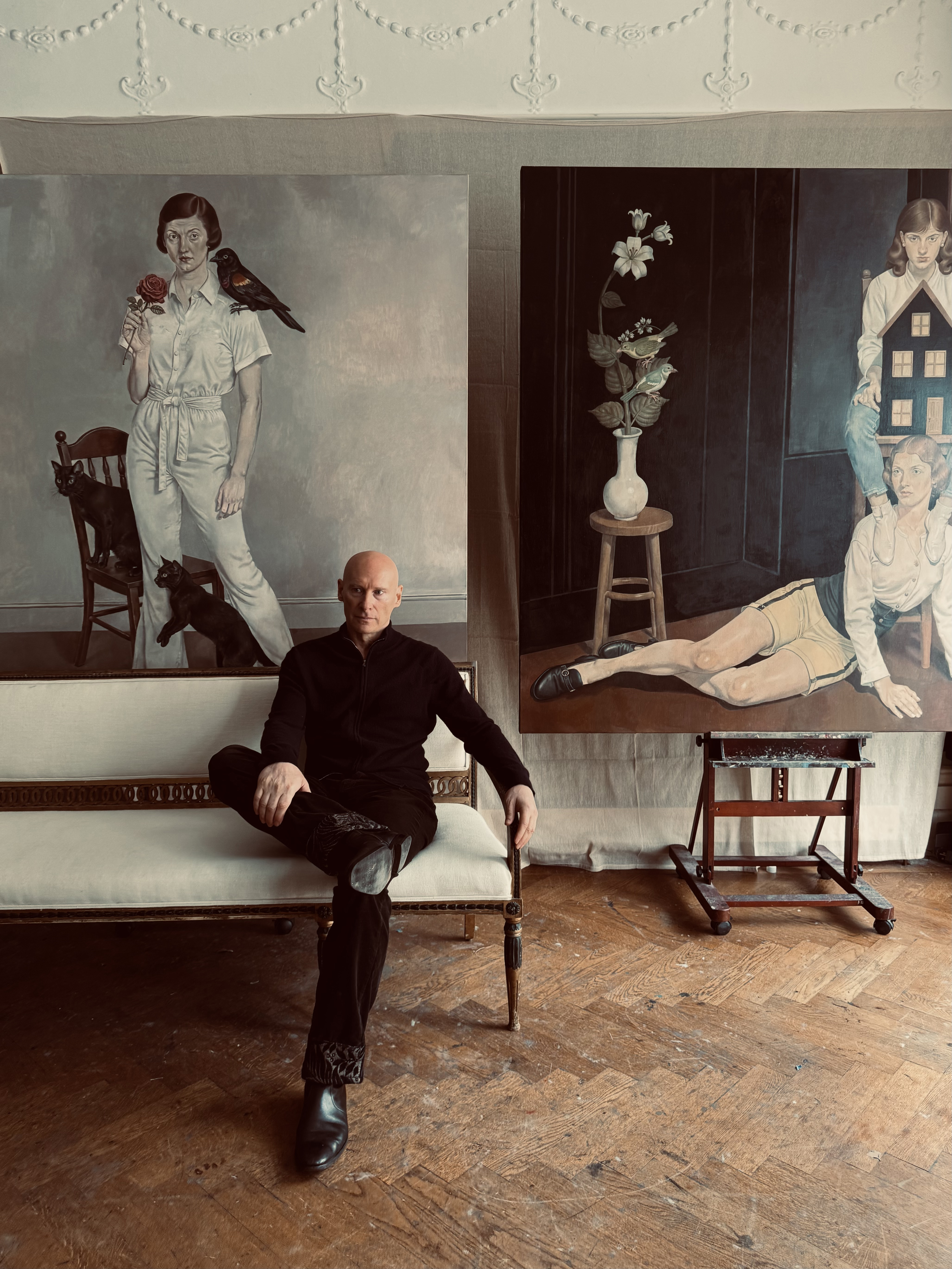
Von Wolfe in the Studio, 2025

In the East End of London in 2002, Lenkiewicz founded T1+2 Art Space which he directed and curated as an independent artist run project for six years. The inaugural show being in Wheeler Street with Gustav Metzger titled, "100,000 Newspapers", a public active installation. Lenkiewicz also collaborated with Metzger on a conference titled, "World's First Congress of Fork Lift Trucks" at the Truman brewery. Invited were speakers Norman Rosenthal, directors of the Serpentine Gallery and curators including Hans Ulrich Obrist. Other notable shows included the Viennese Actionist Otto Muehl who were invited to exhibit paintings and films as well as contributing to talks. Artists shown at T1+2 read as a list of names from most of the generation that followed the YBAs in the East End.

Lenkiewicz exhibited 33 drawings including 3 large-scale works at his first major exhibition, Nu-Trinity, at Dickinson in 2007. Richard Dyer described the exhibition as 'an iconographic investigation into the power inherent in certain images and events, and the mythos associated with them'. Lenkiewicz’s works have since then been exhibited internationally, including Tate Britain and All Visual Arts in London, Palais des Beaux-Arts in Lille, as well as in Dublin, Hamburg, Berlin and Venice.

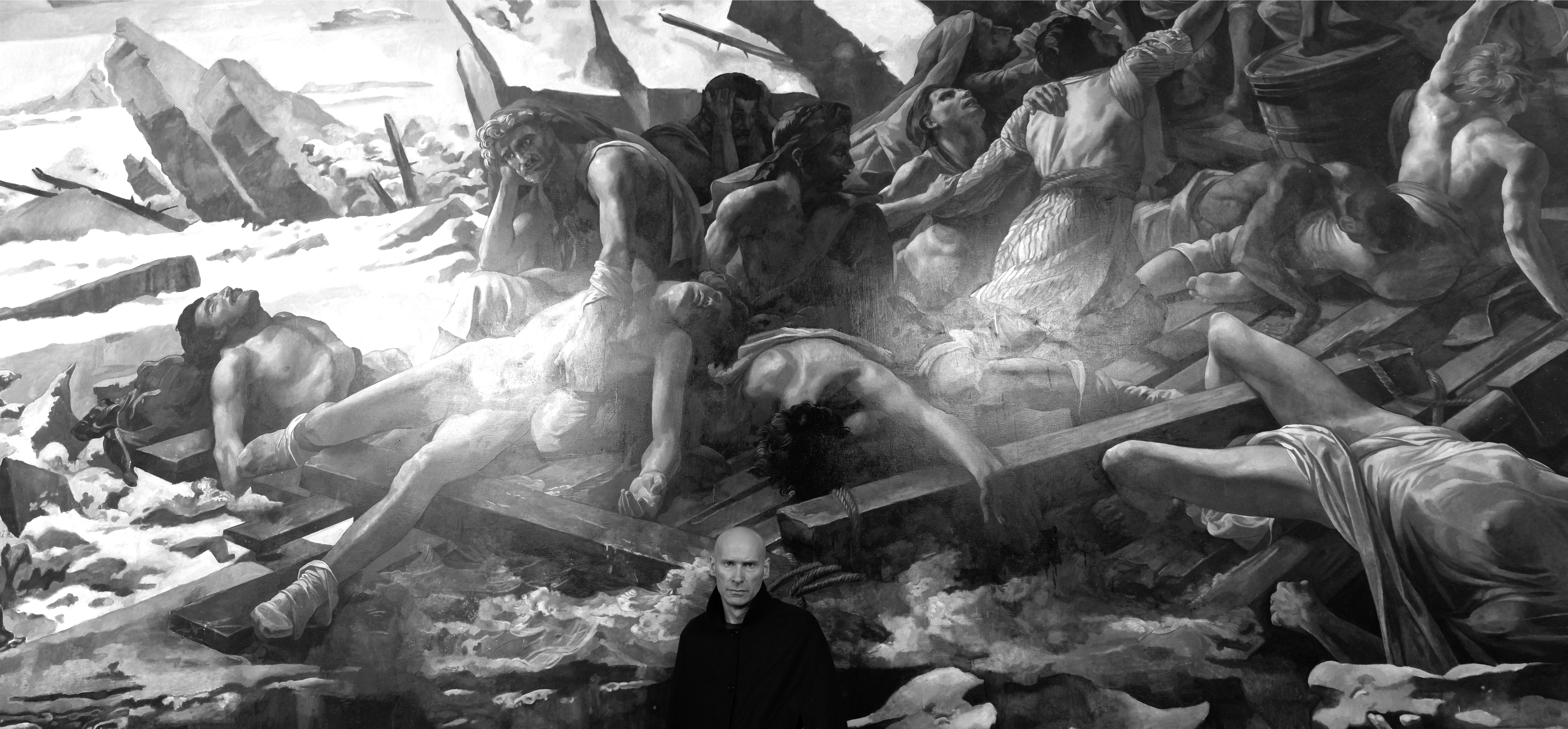
Wolfe von Lenkiewicz working on the Raft

Lenkiewicz was represented by All Visual Arts Gallery directed by Joe la Placa. He painted in a 19th century Roman studio for several months and completed a life size reinterpretation of Théodore Géricault's Raft of the Medusa. After having left Italy, the monumental painting was exhibited at the London gallery AVA with the support of Michael Platt of BlueCrest Capital Management.

In 2009, Lenkiewicz's solo exhibition titled The Descent of Man exhibited over 80 works in a former landmark bank building built originally by Arthur Beresford Pite in London. The space was sponsored by IVG Immobilien property group in order to enable the artist to work on a large scale with the relevant real estate and wall space for three years. Lenkiewicz then moved to a large studio in Grosvenor Place, Belgravia from 2016 until 2019, which was sponsored by Hammer Holdings where Lenkiewicz’s The School of Night was painted.

Until 2021, Lenkiewicz's works primarily dealt with the appropriation of language and mythology by juxtaposing elements such as religious figures, pop culture icons, literary characters and motifs. Lenkiewicz's drawings and paintings often reference iconic imageries, including those by Albrecht Dürer, Pablo Picasso, Andy Warhol, and Hieronymus Bosch. Lenkiewicz transforms Dürer's Self-Portrait (1500) in his Werewolf (2011), referencing Jacques Derrida's The Beast and the Sovereign.

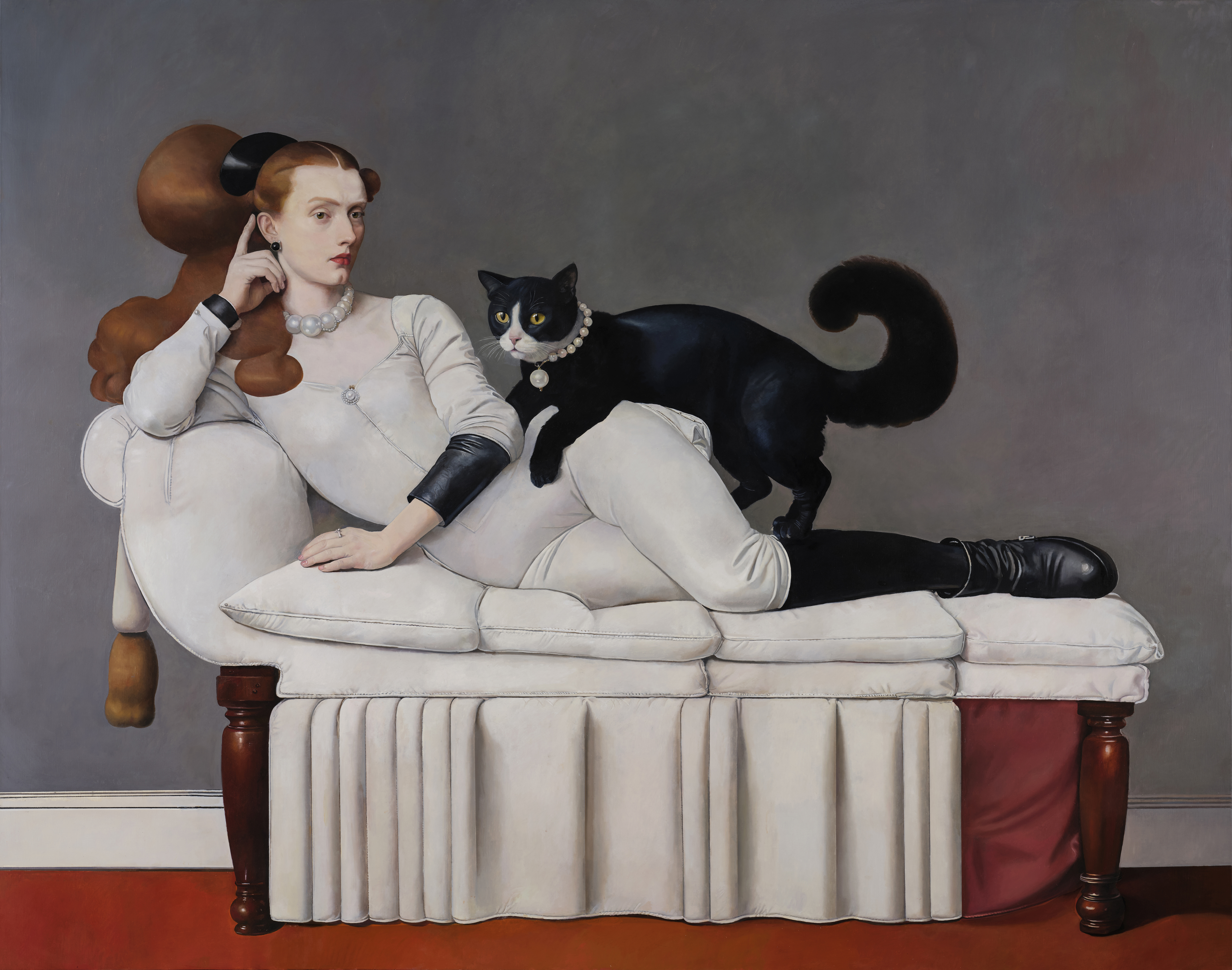
Reflective Grace, 2023, Oil on canvas

Pearls of the Desert, 2024, Oil on canvas

== Exhibitions ==
Upcoming 2025 solo exhibitions include The Still Point, Tang Contemporary Art, Seoul and a solo exhibition with MARUANI MERCIER, Brussels. Von Wolfe will also have a museum retrospective at the Kaohsiung Museum of Fine Arts, Taiwan, in November 2025.

=== Museum Exhibitions ===
Year	Exhibition
2025	The Garden Fortress, Kaohsiung Museum of Fine Arts, Taiwan
2018	Processions of Orpheus, Jewish Museum and Tolerance Center, Moscow
2020	"Inspiration: Contemporary and the Classics", Ateneum Museum, Helsinki
2020	Inspiration: Iconic Works, Nationalmuseum, Stockholm
2018	Processions of Orpheus, Jewish Museum and Tolerance Center, Moscow
2017	Doing Identity, Kunst Museum, Bochum
2017	Proof of Life, Weserburg Museum, Bremen
2016	Persona, Musée Quai Branly, Paris
2012	Babel, Beaux Arts de Lille, Lille
2006	New Gothic, Tate Britain, London

=== Solo Exhibitions ===
Year	Exhibition
2025	The Still Point, Tang Contemporary Art, Seoul
2024	Oracle, Richard Heller Gallery, LA
2023	"Odyssey", 212 Festival, Istanbul
2018	The School of Night, Saatchi Gallery, London
2018	Processions of Orpheus, Jewish Museum and Tolerance Centre, Moscow
2016	L'Oeuvre, House of the Nobleman, London
2016	Meta-History, Riflemaker Gallery, London
2015	Wolfe von Lenkiewicz: A Retrospective, Galerie Michael Haas/Mark Sanders Art Consultancy, Berlin
2015	Delirious Picasso, House of the Nobleman/Mark Sanders Art Consultancy, Academy Mansion, New York
2014	Algebra: The Reunion of Broken Parts, House of the Nobleman/Mark Sanders Art Consultancy, London
2014	Wolfe von Lenkiewicz: Paintings and Drawings, Galerie MIRO, Prague
2014	Snow White and the Knights of Schwangau, Riflemaker Gallery, London
2013	The Raft of the Medusa, All Visual Arts, London
2012	Hieronymus Bosch, All Visual Arts, London
2011	The Beast and the Sovereign, Galerie Michael Haas, Berlin
2011	Liberation: Their Story Begins, Sebastian Guinness Gallery, Ireland
2011	I Have an Excellent Idea...Let's Change the Subject, All Visual Arts, London
2010	Victory Over the Sum, Triumph Gallery, Moscow
2009	The Descent of Man, All Visual Arts, London
2008	Nu-Trinity, Simon Dickinson, London
2007	Mutagenesis, Mimmo Scognamiglio Contemporary Art, Naples
2007	Mutagenesis, Paradise Row, London
2007	Emblematic Psychosis, Ingalls & Associates, Miami
2001	The Park, T1+2 Artspace, London
2000	Hangman, T1+2 Artspace, London

=== Selected Group Exhibitions ===
Year	Exhibition
2024	Seeing Red, Phillips Berkeley Square, London
2023	AND QUIETLY THE NIGHT ARRIVES..., Steinhauser Gallery, ZOYA Museum, Modra
2023	FEMME F(R)ICTION, C1760, Academy Mansion, New York
2022	Once Upon a Time..., Flora Fairbairn and Co, Chiltern St London, UK
2020	Inspiration: Contemporary and the Classics, Ateneum Museum, Helsinki
2020	Cranach: Artist and Innovator, Compton Verney Art Gallery, Warwickshire, UK
2020	Inspiration: Iconic Works, National Museum, Stockholm
2019	Dangerous Beauty, Colnaghi Gallery, London
2019	Hommage a Leonard et a la Renaissance, Chateau du Rivau, France
2018	TEFAF Maastricht, Beck and Eggeling, Maastricht
2018	Strange Beauty, Beck and Eggeling, Dusseldorf
2018	Painting Still Alive, Galerie Michael Haas/Center for Contemporary Art, Turin
2017	Doing Identity: The Reydan Weiss Collection, Kunstmuseum Bochum, Bochum
2017	Munich Highlights, Beck and Eggeling, Munich
2017	I Lost My Heart to a Starship Trooper, Griffin Gallery, London
2016	Forever, Bubox, Kortrijk, Belgium
2016	Persona, Musee Quai Branly, Paris
2015	Picasso in Contemporary Art, Wexner Centre for the Arts, Columbus, Ohio
2015	Picasso in Contemporary Art, Deichtorhallen, Hamburg
2015	The Remarkable Lightness of Being, Aeroplastics Contemporary, Brussels
2014	Art Basel, Galerie Michael Haas, Basel
2013	Wonderful: Humboldt, Krokodil & Polke, Me Collectors Room, Berlin
2013	Viewing Room, All Visual Arts, London
2013	Between the Lines: A Group Drawing Show, All Visual Arts, London
2012	Memories of the Future, La Maison Rouge, Paris
2012	Metamorphosis, All Visual Arts, London
2012	Babel, Beaux Arts de Lille, Lille
2012	Everywhere and Nowhere, Villa Jauss, Obersdorf
2011	The House of the Nobleman, London
2011	Zwei Sammler, Deichtorhallen, Hamburg
2010	Vanitas: The Transience of Earthly Pleasures, All Visual Arts, London
2010	The House of the Nobleman, London
2009	The Age of the Marvellous, All Visual Arts, London
2009	The Embassy, 20 Hoxton Square Projects, London
2007	Avatar of Sacred Discontent, T1+2 Gallery, London
2007	Avatar of Sacred Discontent, Port Eliot LitFest, St Germans
2006	New Gothic, Tate Britain, London
2006	End of Civilisation, Port Eliot Castle, St Germans
2006	Great Eastern Hotel, Kristy Stubbs Gallery, London
2005	Go Between, Magazine 4, Kunstverein, Bregenz
2003	World's First Congress of Fork Lift Trucks, Atlantis Gallery, London
2003	100,000 Newspapers: Gustav Metzger, Stewart Home, Wolfe von Lenkiewicz, T1+2 Artspace, London
2001	The Constant of Variation, T1+2 Artspace, London

=== Upcoming exhibitions ===
Year	Exhibition
2025	Von Wolfe: The Space In Between, MARUANI MERCIER, Brussels
2025	The Garden Fortress, The Kaohsiung Museum of Fine Arts, Taiwan
