= Penry Williams (historian) =

Welsh historian

- Born: Penry Herbert Williams; February 25, 1925; Calcutta, India
- Died: April 30, 2013 (aged 88); Oxford, England
- Spouse: June (m. 1952; died 1991)
- Children: 2

Academic background
- Education: Marlborough College
- Alma mater: New College, Oxford
- Thesis: The Council in the Marches of Wales Under Elizabeth I (1955)
- Doctoral advisor: E. F. Jacob

Academic work
- Institutions: Victoria University of Manchester; New College, Oxford
- Doctoral students: Ian Archer; David Norbrook
- Notable works: The Tudor Regime

Penry Herbert Williams (25 February 1925 – 30 April 2013) was a Welsh historian of Elizabethan Britain who taught at New College, Oxford for almost thirty years.

== Early life ==
He was born in Calcutta to a father from Brecknockshire and he was educated at Marlborough College. During the Second World War Williams served in India and Java as a member of the Royal Artillery. He then read history at New College, Oxford, where J. E. Neale suggested he study Wales under the government of Elizabeth I. His doctoral thesis, The Council in the Marches of Wales under Elizabeth I, was published in 1958. His supervisor was the medievalist E. F. Jacob, since the natural choice for an Elizabethan thesis, R. B. Wernham, was ill.

== Academic career ==
He taught history at the Victoria University of Manchester from 1951 until 1964 and at New College from 1964 until 1992.

In his 1979 work, The Tudor Regime, Williams repudiated Geoffrey Elton's focus on the central administrative institutions of government in The Tudor Revolution in Government, and instead asserted the importance of local patronage and favouritism. Williams argued that "the strength of Tudor government lay in a skilful combination of the formal and the informal, the official and the personal".

He edited The English Historical Review from 1982 until 1990. He wrote The Later Tudors: England, 1547–1603 (1995) for the New Oxford History of England series.

== Personal life ==
Williams married June, originally from South Africa in 1952. They had two children together, a son and a daughter; June died in 1991. Williams later began a relationship with Sylvia Platt which lasted until his death. His politics were moderately left-wing; he first supported Labour, then the SDP and finally the Liberal Democrats. He also campaigned on behalf of asylum seekers, including those held at Campsfield House immigration detention centre, which he frequently visited.

== Works ==
=== Books ===
- The Council in the Marches of Wales under Elizabeth I (University of Wales Press, 1958). ISBN 0708300464
- Life in Tudor England (London: B. T. Batsford, 1964). ISBN 0713414588
- The Tudor Regime (Oxford: Oxford University Press, 1979). ISBN 0198224915
- (editor with John Buxton), New College, Oxford, 1379-1979 (Oxford: New College, 1979). ISBN 0950651001
- The Later Tudors: England, 1547–1603 (Oxford: Clarendon Press, 1995). ISBN 0198228201
- (editor with George W. Bernard), Jennifer Loach, Edward VI (New Haven: Yale University Press, 1999). ISBN 0300079923
- (with Mark Nicholls), Sir Walter Raleigh: In Life and Legend (London: Bloomsbury Continuum, 2011). ISBN 144111209X

=== Articles ===
- ‘Dr. Elton's Interpretation of the Age’, Past & Present, No. 25 (Jul., 1963), pp. 3–8.
- ‘The Tudor State’, Past & Present, No. 25 (Jul., 1963), pp. 39–58.
- (with G. L. Harriss), ‘A Revolution in Tudor History?’, Past & Present, No. 31 (Jul., 1965), pp. 87–96.
