= Asher Achinstein =

American economist

- Born: December 6, 1900; New York City, U.S.
- Died: September 20, 1998 (age 97); Cross Keys, Baltimore, Maryland, U.S.
- Education: City College of New York (B.A.); Columbia University (M.A., Ph.D.)
- Spouses: Betty Comras (died 1964): Martha Levitsky
- Children: Peter J. Achinstein

Asher Achinstein (/ˈækɪnstaɪn/; December 6, 1900 – September 20, 1998) was an American economist and a member of the Council of Economic Advisors during the Dwight D. Eisenhower administration.

== Biography ==
Achinstein was born on December 6, 1900, in New York City. He was Jewish. He graduated with a B.A. from the City College of New York and with a M.A. and PhD. from Columbia University. He worked for the New York State Board of Housing. In 1951, he accepted a position with the Legislative Reference Service of the Library of Congress conducting economic research for the members of Congress; he remained in the position until 1970. In 1954, he was appointed to the Council of Economic Advisers by President Dwight D. Eisenhower.

In 1950, Achinstein published Introduction to Business Cycles.

== Personal life ==
In the 1930s, he married Betty Comras (died 1964); they had one son, philosopher Peter J. Achinstein. In 1965, he married Martha Levitsky. He died on September 20, 1998, in Cross Keys.
