= Stephen F. Barker =

American philosopher of mathematics (1927–2019)

Stephen Francis Barker (January 11, 1927 – December 16, 2019) was an American philosopher of mathematics, a professor emeritus of philosophy in the Department of Philosophy, Krieger School of Arts and Sciences at Johns Hopkins University. He was also a faculty member at the University of Southern California, the University of Virginia and Ohio State University.

He was born in Ann Arbor, Michigan. In 1948, he served in the Navy for a year. He then proceeded in 1949 to earn a bachelor's degree from Swarthmore College. He got his master's degree as well as Ph.D in philosophy from Harvard University in 1951 and 1954 respectively. While at Harvard, he won the Bechtel Prize in 1951 for his essay, "A Study of Phenomenalism".

Later, he became an instructor in the University of Southern California in 1954–55. He became an assistant professor in the University of Virginia and then was made an associate professor in the same university from 1956 to 1961. He became a professor at Ohio State University from 1961 to1964. He reached the peak of his career when he arrived at Johns Hopkins as a professor in 1964 where he was named professor emeritus upon his retirement in 2002.

Barker was not just a professor or a professor emeritus, he was also a Sheldon Traveling Fellow in England in 1952–53. Harvard awarded him the George Santayana Fellowship for the academic year 1955–56. In addition, he became a Guggenheim Fellow in 1964–65.

Barker was married to Evelyn Barker, who was also a philosopher and died in 2003. Baker himself eventually died in 2019 at 92 years of age.

== Books ==
Barker is the author of:

- Induction and hypothesis: a study of the logic of confirmation (Cornell University Press, 1957). This study of theories of informal reasoning is structured in four parts: an investigation of the problem of induction, a rejection of explanations based on overriding premises (such as the uniformity of nature) as a form of begging the question, an overview of positivist approaches to the problem, and finally a resolution to the problem based on theories of John George Kemeny involving the selection of the most likely hypothesis to fit a set of observations.
- Philosophy of mathematics (Prentice-Hall, 1964). Part of a series of books (edited by Elizabeth and Monroe Beardsley) overviewing the main areas of philosophy, this book describes the main problems in the philosophy of mathematics and evaluates their proposed solutions. Its five chapters concern Euclidean and non-Euclidean geometry, and literalist and non-literalist views on the meaning of numbers.
- The elements of logic (McGraw Hill, 1965)
- Thomas Reid critical interpretations (with Tom L. Beauchamp, Philosophical monographs, 1976)

In addition, he edited John Wisdom's Proof and explanation: the Virginia lectures (University Press of America, 1991), co-edited The Legacy of logical positivism; studies in the philosophy of science with Peter Achinstein (Johns Hopkins Press, 1969),
