= Roger Woolhouse =

English philosopher

Roger Stuart Woolhouse (15 February 1940 – 24 September 2011) was an English philosopher, an expert on empiricism and rationalism and a biographer of John Locke.

== Biography ==
He was born in Wath-upon-Dearne and educated at Saltburn Primary School, Sir William Turner's Grammar School, London University (philosophy) and then Selwyn College, Cambridge for his Doctorate.

From 1969 until his retirement in 2001, Woolhouse worked in the Department of Philosophy at the University of York.

Cambridge University Press requested Woolhouse write a biography of Locke, the last major biography being Maurice Cranston's 1957 work. Woolhouse's biography appeared in 2007.

He died in 2011. After his death, York's Department of Philosophy founded the Roger Woolhouse Prize, an annual £500 prize awarded to MA Philosophy students.

== Works ==
- Locke (Prentice Hall / Harvester Wheatsheaf, 1984).
- The Empiricists (Oxford University Press, 1988).
- Descartes, Spinoza, Leibniz: The Concept of Substance in Seventeenth Century Metaphysics (Routledge, 1993).
- Locke: A Biography. Cambridge University Press. 2007 – via Internet Archive.
- Starting with Leibniz (Continuum, 2010).
