= Bryan Magee =

British philosopher and politician (1930–2019)

- Magee in 1987

Member of Parliament for Leyton
- In office 28 February 1974 – 13 May 1983
- Preceded by: Patrick Gordon Walker
- Succeeded by: Harry Cohen

Personal details
- Born: Bryan Edgar Magee; 12 April 1930 Hoxton, London, England
- Died: 26 July 2019 (aged 89) Headington, Oxford, England
- Party: Labour (1958–1982); Social Democratic (1982–1983)
- Spouse: Ingrid Söderlund (m. 1954, divorced)
- Children: 1

Academic background
- Education: Christ's Hospital; Keble College, Oxford; Yale University

Academic work
- Era: Contemporary philosophy
- Region: Western philosophy
- School or tradition: Revival of transcendental idealism
- Institutions: Balliol College, Oxford
- Main interests: Metaphysics, epistemology, history of philosophy

Bryan Edgar Magee (/məˈɡiː/; 12 April 1930 – 26 July 2019) was a British philosopher, broadcaster, politician, and author, known for bringing philosophy to a popular audience.

Magee influenced popular culture with his efforts to make philosophy accessible to the layman, especially as a broadcaster on the BBC, interviewing a number of leading philosophers. In parallel, he was interested in politics and was elected as a Labour Party Member of Parliament (MP) for the Leyton parliament constituency in the February 1974 UK general election. He also wrote books, including The Philosophy of Schopenhauer, first published in 1983, and revised in 1997. His interests included the life, thought, and works of the composer Richard Wagner.

== Early life ==
Magee was born in 1930 in Hoxton, London to working-class parents; his father, Frederick Knut (or Canute) Magee (1902–1947) was a clothier's manager, and his mother, Sheila Kathleen (or Catherine; b. 1903) was daughter of labourer Joseph Sidney Lynch. His upbringing was poor; having been born within a few hundred yards of where his paternal grandparents were born, he was brought up in a flat above the family clothing shop, where, until the age of five, he shared a bed with his elder sister, Joan. He was close to his father, but had a difficult relationship with his abusive and overbearing mother, who was "cold and distant". He was evacuated to Market Harborough in Leicestershire, during World War II, but when he returned to London, much of Hoxton had been bombed flat. Magee was educated at Christ's Hospital school on a London County Council scholarship. During this formative period, he developed a keen interest in socialist politics, while during the school holidays he enjoyed listening to political orators at Speakers' Corner, Hyde Park, London, as well as regular visits to the theatre and concerts.

During his National Service, he served in the British Army, in the Intelligence Corps, seeking possible spies among the refugees crossing the border between Yugoslavia and Austria. After demobilisation, he won a scholarship to Keble College, Oxford, where he studied history as an undergraduate and then Philosophy, Politics and Economics in one year. His friends at Oxford included Robin Day, William Rees-Mogg, Jeremy Thorpe and Michael Heseltine. While at university, Magee was elected president of the Oxford Union. He later became an honorary fellow at Keble College.

At Oxford, Magee had mixed with poets as well as politicians and in 1951 published a volume of verse through the Fortune Press. The publisher did not pay its writers and expected them to buy a certain number of copies themselves – a similar deal had been struck with such writers as Dylan Thomas and Philip Larkin for their first anthologies. The slim volume was dedicated to the memory of Richard Wagner, with a quote from Rilke's Duino Elegies: ... das Schöne ist nichts als des Schrecklichen Anfang, den wir noch grade ertragen ("... beauty is nothing but the beginning of terror, that we are still able to bear"). Magee said later: "I'm rather ashamed of the poems now, although I have written poems since which I haven't published, which I secretly think are rather good. It has always been a dimension of what I do." Later he also wrote fiction, including a spy novel To Live in Danger in 1960 and then a long work Facing Death. The latter, initially composed in the 1960s but not published until 1977, was shortlisted for an award by The Yorkshire Post.

In 1955, he began a year studying philosophy at Yale University on a postgraduate fellowship. He had expected to hate America but found that he loved it. His deep admiration of the country's equality of opportunity was expressed in a swift series of books, Go West, Young Man (1958), The New Radicalism (1963) and The Democratic Revolution (1964). He taught philosophy at Balliol College, Oxford for a period but was not enamoured of the analytic philosophy then in vogue there.

== Politics ==
Magee returned to Britain with hopes of becoming a Labour Member of Parliament (MP). He twice stood unsuccessfully for Mid Bedfordshire, at the 1959 general election and the 1960 by-election, and instead took a job presenting the ITV current affairs television programme This Week. He made documentary programmes about subjects of social concern such as prostitution, sexually transmitted diseases, abortion and homosexuality (illegal in Britain at the time). Interviewed in 2003, Magee said:

British society was illiberal in a number of areas that are now taken for granted... Roy Jenkins changed them and he was bitterly opposed by the Tories. But if you were liberal with a small L there was a menu of social change and I believed very strongly in that whole liberal agenda.

He was eventually elected MP for Leyton at the February 1974 general election. In Making the Most of It, Magee wrote that he decided that the Commons was not suitable for him when he was sitting next to Renee Short, as she constantly interrupted a Conservative to call him a "twit". He resolved not to spend much time on Parliamentary debates, and preferred to make use of the Commons library for his own research and to act efficiently on correspondence from his constituents. He sometimes went out to the theatre on an evening and returned to Parliament in time to vote, having missed the debate.

Magee was on the right of the Labour Party: he opposed nationalisation, nuclear disarmament and friendly relations with the Communist countries. He stated that he "detested" Harold Wilson as devoid of principle, and criticised Callaghan for not understanding the role of negotiations with trade unions. Early in Thatcher's career, Magee had friendly relations with her and the two discussed Karl Popper's philosophy, but he later described her as "limited, narrow, even blinkered". As a member of the Labour Party's Manifesto Group, which advocated unity of all Labour MPs behind the election manifesto, he wrote the pamphlet What We Must Do.

From 1981, Magee found himself out of tune with the Labour Party's direction under Michael Foot, and he decided to leave after he could not bring himself to oppose the Thatcher Government's agenda of curtailing the power of trade unions. On 22 January 1982, he resigned the Labour whip and in March joined the defection of centrist Labour MPs to the newly founded Social Democratic Party. He lost his seat at the 1983 general election.

When asked what he felt he had achieved as an MP, Magee named his work to clear the name of his constituent, David Cooper, for the murder of a postmaster, which he believes the police had framed him for. He contributed to the 1980 book Wicked Beyond Belief, which was published three weeks before David Cooper was released from prison.

Magee returned to writing and broadcasting, which, indeed, he had continued during his parliamentary career and served on various boards and committees. He notably resigned as chairman of the Arts Council music panel in 1994 in protest at funding cuts.

He returned to scholarship at Oxford, first as a fellow at Wolfson, then at New College. He was from 1984 a senior research fellow in the History of Ideas at King's College London and, from 1994, a visiting professor. He found more time to write classical music reviews and worked on his own compositions. He admitted that, while his own work was "whistleable", it was "inherently sentimental".

Interviewed in 2003, Oxford contemporary Lord Rees-Mogg recalled, "we never knew which way Bryan would jump. And as his life later demonstrated, there was always a question of whether he was basically at heart an intellectual or someone interested in public life. So it wasn't a surprise that he went into public life, but the intellectual was really the predominant element in his personality, and the books seemed to represent the real Bryan more than the political activity did."

== Broadcaster and writer ==
=== Interviews with philosophers ===
An important influence in popular culture was his effort to make philosophy accessible to the layman. In 1970–1971, he presented a series for BBC Radio 3 entitled Conversations with Philosophers. The series took the form of Magee in conversation with a number of contemporary British philosophers, discussing both their own work, and the work of earlier 20th-century British philosophers. The series began with an introductory conversation between Magee and Anthony Quinton. Other programmes included discussions on Bertrand Russell, G. E. Moore and J. L. Austin, Ludwig Wittgenstein, and the relationship between philosophy and religion, among others. Extracts of each of the conversations were printed in The Listener shortly after broadcast. And extensively revised versions of all the discussions would be made available in the 1971 book Modern British Philosophy. Karl Popper would appear in the series twice and Magee would soon after write an introductory book on his philosophy that was first published in 1973.

In 1978, Magee presented 15 dialogues with noted philosophers for BBC Television in a series called Men of Ideas. As The Daily Telegraph noted, this series "achieved the near-impossible feat of presenting to a mass audience recondite issues of philosophy without compromising intellectual integrity or losing ratings" and "attracted a steady one million viewers per show." Following an "Introduction to Philosophy", presented by Magee in discussion with Isaiah Berlin, Magee discussed topics like Marxist philosophy, the Frankfurt School, the ideas of Noam Chomsky, and modern Existentialism in subsequent episodes. During the broadcast run, edited shorter versions of the discussions were published weekly in The Listener magazine. Extensively revised versions of the dialogues within the Men of Ideas series (which featured Iris Murdoch) were originally published in a book of the same name that is now sold under the title of Talking Philosophy. DVDs of the series are sold to academic institutions with the title Contemporary Philosophy. Neither this series nor its 1987 'sequel' are available for purchase by home users but most of the episodes are freely available on YouTube.

Another BBC television series, The Great Philosophers, followed in 1987. In this series, Magee discussed the major historical figures of Western philosophy with fifteen contemporary philosophers. The series covered the philosophies of Plato, Aristotle, and Descartes, among others, including a discussion with Peter Singer on the philosophy of Marx and Hegel, and ending with a discussion with John Searle on the philosophy of Wittgenstein. Extensively revised versions of the dialogues were published in a book of the same name that was published that same year. The series was repeated on BBC Four in October and November 2025, and also made available on iPlayer. Magee's 1998 book The Story of Thought (also published as The Story of Philosophy) would also cover the history of Western philosophy.

Between the two series, Magee released the first edition of the work he regarded as closest to his "academic magnum opus": The Philosophy of Schopenhauer (first published in 1983, substantially revised and extended, 1997). This remains one of the most substantial and wide-ranging treatments of the thinker and assesses in-depth Schopenhauer's influence on Wittgenstein, Wagner, and other creative writers. Magee also addresses Schopenhauer's thoughts on homosexuality and the influence of Buddhism on his thought.

== Later work and interest in Wagner ==
In 1997, Magee's Confessions of a Philosopher was published. This essentially offered an introduction to philosophy in autobiographical form. The book was involved in a libel lawsuit as a result of Magee repeating the rumour that Ralph Schoenman, a controversial associate of Bertrand Russell during the philosopher's final decade, had been planted by the CIA in an effort to discredit Russell. Schoenman successfully sued Magee for libel in the UK, with the result that the first printing of the British edition of the book was pulped. A second defamation suit, filed in California against Random House, was settled in 2001. The allegations were expunged by settlement, and a new edition was issued and provided to more than 700 academic and public libraries. In Confessions of a Philosopher, Magee charts his own philosophical development in an autobiographical context. He also emphasizes the importance of Schopenhauer's philosophy as a serious attempt to solve philosophical problems. In addition to this, he launches a critique of analytic philosophy, particularly in its linguistic form, over three chapters, contesting its fundamental principles and lamenting its influence.

Magee had a particular interest in the life, thought, and music of Richard Wagner and wrote two notable books on the composer and his world, Aspects of Wagner (1968; rev. 1988), and Wagner and Philosophy (2000). In Aspects of Wagner Magee "outlines the range and depth of Wagner's achievement, and shows how his sensational and erotic music expresses the repressed and highly charged contents of the psyche. He also examines Wagner's detailed stage directions, and the prose works in which he formulated his ideas, and sheds interesting new light on his anti-semitism." The revised edition includes a fresh chapter on "Wagner as Music".

In 2016, approaching his 86th birthday, Magee had his book Ultimate Questions published by Princeton University. Writing in The Independent, Julian Baggini said "Magee doesn't always match his clarity of expression with rigour of argument, sometimes ignoring his own principle that the feeling 'Yes, surely this must be right' is 'not a validation, not even a credential'. But this can be excused. Plato and Aristotle claimed that philosophy begins with wonder. Magee is proof that for some, the wonder never dies, it only deepens."

In 2018, Magee, then living in one room in a nursing home in Oxford, was interviewed by Jason Cowley of New Statesman and discussed his life and his 2016 book Ultimate Questions. Magee said that he believed he lacked originality and, until Ultimate Questions, had struggled to make an original contribution to philosophy, saying:

Popper had this originality, Russell had it, and Einstein had it in spades. Einstein created a way of seeing things which transformed the way we see the world and the way we even understand such fundamental things as time and space. And I fundamentally understand that I could never do that, never. I wish I was in that class – not because I want to be a clever chap but because I want to do things that are at a much better level than I've done them.

He went on to discuss his continuing interest in politics and current affairs and to describe the Brexit yes vote as a "historic mistake".

== Personal life ==
In 1953, Magee was appointed to a teaching job in Sweden and while there met Ingrid Söderlund, a pharmacist in the university laboratory. They married the following year and had one daughter, Gunnela, and, in time, three grandchildren. Magee said in 2003:

The marriage broke up pretty quickly and it was a fairly disastrous period of my life. I came back to Oxford as a postgraduate. But since then Sweden has been a part of my life. I go there every year and my daughter visits me. I always assumed that sooner or later I'd get married again but it never quite happened, although I had some very long relationships. And now I don't want to get married again. I like the freedom.

His memoir, Clouds of Glory: A Hoxton Childhood, won The Ackerley Prize in 2004.

== Death ==
Magee died on 26 July 2019, at the age of 89, at St Luke's Hospital in Headington, Oxford, the care home in which he had spent his final years. His funeral took place on 15 August.

The last of Magee's books to be published during his lifetime – Making the Most of It (2018) – closes:

If it could be revealed to me for certain that life is meaningless, and that my lot when I die will be timeless oblivion, and I were then asked: "Knowing these things, would you, if given the choice, still choose to have been born?", my answer would be a shouted "Yes!" I have loved living. Even if the worst-case scenario is the true one, what I have had has been infinitely better than nothing. In spite of what has been wrong with my life, and in spite of what has been wrong with me, I am inexpressibly grateful to have lived. It is terrible and terrifying to have to die, but even the prospect of eternal annihilation is a price worth paying for being alive.

A celebration of his life was held in the chapel of Keble College, Oxford, on 29 October 2019. The event was opened by Sir Jonathan Phillips, Warden of Keble College, and was introduced by Magee's executor, the academic, author, and editor Henry Hardy. It included audio and video clips of Magee, music chosen by him and played by the Amherst Sextet, and addresses by David Owen and Simon Callow. The music choices were the sextet from Strauss's Capriccio, the largo from Elgar's Serenade for Strings and the prelude to Wagner's Tristan und Isolde. The addresses by Owen and Callow were published together with a notice of Magee's life by Hardy in the Oldie.

== Filmography ==
=== Television ===
- Men of Ideas (BBC, 1978), host
- Thinking Aloud (1984–1985), host
- The Great Philosophers (BBC, 1987), host

== Bibliography ==
=== Books ===
(Some available for loan via Internet Archive)

- Crucifixion and Other Poems, 1951, Fortune Press, ASIN: B0039UQCKK
- Go West, Young Man, Eyre And Spottiswoode, 1958, OCLC 6884140
- To Live in Danger, Hutchinson, 1960 (softcover Random House ISBN 0-09-001700-5)
- The New Radicalism, Secker & Warburg, 1962, ASIN B0006D7RZW
- The Democratic Revolution, Bodley Head, 1964, ISBN 978-0-370-00314-6
- Towards 2000: The World We Make, Macdonald & Co, 1965, ASIN B0000CMK0Y
- One in Twenty: A Study of Homosexuality in Men and Women, Stein and Day, 1966. OCLC 654348375 (later published as The Gays Among Us)
- The Television Interviewer, Macdonald, 1966, ASIN B0000CN1D4
- Aspects of Wagner, Secker and Warburg, 1968; rev. 2nd ed, 1988, Oxford University Press, 1988, ISBN 0-19-284012-6
- Modern British Philosophy, Secker and Warburg, 1971, ISBN 0-436-27104-4; Oxford University Press, ISBN 0-19-283047-3
- Karl Popper, Penguin, 1973, ISBN 0-670-01967-4 (Viking Press, ISBN 0-670-41174-4; also titled Popper, and later titled Philosophy and the Real World, 1985)
- Facing Death, William Kimber & Co. Ltd., 1977, ISBN 0-7183-0135-8
- Men of Ideas: Some Creators of Contemporary Philosophy, Oxford University Press, 1978 ISBN 0-19-283034-1 (later titled Talking Philosophy: Dialogues With Fifteen Leading Philosophers)
- The Philosophy of Schopenhauer, Oxford University Press, 1983 (revised and expanded, 1997), ISBN 0-19-823722-7
- The Great Philosophers: An Introduction to Western Philosophy, BBC Books 1987, Oxford University Press, 2000, ISBN 0-19-289322-X
- On Blindness: Letters between Bryan Magee and Martin Milligan, Oxford University Press, 1996, ISBN 0-19-823543-7 (also published as Sight Unseen, Phoenix House, 1998, ISBN 0-7538-0503-0)
- Confessions of a Philosopher, Random House, 1997, reprinted 1998, ISBN 0-375-50028-6
- The Story of Thought: The Essential Guide to the History of Western Philosophy, The Quality Paperback Bookclub, 1998, ISBN 0-7894-4455-0 (later titled The Story of Philosophy, 2001, ISBN 0-7894-7994-X)
- Wagner and Philosophy, Penguin, 2001, ISBN 0-14-029519-4 (also published as The Tristan Chord: Wagner and Philosophy, Owl Books, 2001 ISBN 0-8050-7189-X)
- Clouds of Glory, Pimlico, 2004, ISBN 0-7126-3560-2
- Growing up in a War, Pimlico, 2007, ISBN 1-84595-087-9
- Ultimate Questions, Princeton University Press, 2016, ISBN 978-0-691-17065-7
- Making the Most of It, Studio 28, 2018, ISBN 978-1980636137

=== Journal articles ===
At JSTOR – free to read online with registration:

- "Richard Wagner Died 13 February 1883. Producing a New 'Ring'" The Musical Times, vol. 124, no. 1680, 1983, pp. 86–89 – interview with Peter Hall.
- "Schopenhauer and Professor Hamlyn" Philosophy, vol. 60, no. 233, 1985, pp. 389–391.
- "A Note on J. L. Austin and the Drama". Philosophy, vol. 74, no. 287, 1999, pp. 119–121.
- "What I Believe" Philosophy, vol. 77, no. 301, 2002, pp. 407–419..
- "Philosophy's Neglect of the Arts" Philosophy, vol. 80, no. 313, 2005, pp. 413–422.
- "The Secret of Tristan and Isolde" Philosophy, vol. 82, no. 320, 2007, pp. 339–346.
- "Intimations of Mortality" Philosophy, vol. 86, no. 335, 2011, pp. 31–39.
- ."Clarity in Philosophy". Philosophy. vol. 89 no. 349, 2014,, pp. 451–62

Other written works

- "Scenes from my childhood" in: (ed.) Griffiths, A. Phillips, The Impulse to Philosophise (Royal Institute of Philosophy Supplements, 33) (1993)
- "Sense and nonsense", Prospect, February 20, 2000
- "Pensées by Bryan Magee". New Statesman. 28 July 2021 (a selection made from his notebooks)

Parliament of the United Kingdom
Preceded by Patrick Gordon Walker	Member of Parliament for Leyton; Feb 1974–1983	Succeeded by Harry Cohen
