= Allen Phillips Griffiths =

Welsh philosopher (1927–2014)

- Griffiths in 1971
- Born: 11 June 1927; Llandaff, Cardiff, Wales
- Died: 1 December 2014 (aged 87)
- Occupation: Philosopher

Allen Phillips Griffiths (11 June 1927 – 1 December 2014) was a Welsh philosopher and founding Professor of Philosophy of the University of Warwick.

== Life ==
A. Phillips Griffiths (as he was published) or "Griff" (as he was known to colleagues) was born in Llandaff, in Cardiff, Wales on 11 June 1927. He was the son of John Phillips Griffiths (d. 1941) and Elsie Maud née Jones (d. 1975).

After schooling at Whitchurch Cardiff Grammar, in 1943 he began undergraduate studies of History at (the then) University College, Cardiff. His studies were interrupted by national service begun at the end of the war for which he served in the Intelligence Corps and was deployed to the Middle East.

After his military service, he returned to study at Cardiff, graduating with first class honours in 1951. In 1953, under the supervision of H.H. Price, he received a B.Phil. at Oxford. He first taught at University College of Wales, Aberystwyth (1955–7), before moving to Birkbeck College (1957–64).

In 1964, Griffiths became founding Professor of Philosophy of the new University of Warwick. At the time, he was the youngest professor of philosophy in the UK. He served as Pro-Vice-Chancellor there from 1970 to 1977, retiring in 1992 as professor emeritus. He served as the Director of the Royal Institute of Philosophy from 1979 to 1994.

He died on 1 December 2014.

He had been a noted enthusiast of snuff.

== Select works ==
Authored papers/chapters

- (1956) "Formulating Moral Principles" Mind. 65 (1): 38–48.
- (1957) ‘"Justifying Moral Principles" Proceedings of the Aristotelian Society. 58: 103–124
- (1963) "On Belief’" Proceedings of the Aristotelian Society, vol. 63 (1962–3) Reprinted in Knowledge and Belief (1967)
- (1967) "Ultimate Moral Principles: Their Justification" in: (ed.) Edwards, Paul, Encyclopedia of Philosophy vol. 8, pp. 177–82
- (1972) "A Deduction of Universities" in: (ed.) Archambault, Reginald D., Philosophical Analysis and Education (International Library of the Philosophy of Education Volume 1) (Note: "one of the few papers on universities that have been published in the field of philosophy ... what Griffiths' thesis amounts to is that what is central to the concept of a university is the pursuit of learning, construed as involving a concern with and for universal objects ... The more peripheral features ... are teaching, education, the pursuit of useful arts, and the provision of a preparation for life")

Edited books

- (ed.) Knowledge and Belief (Oxford, 1967).
- (ed.) Of Liberty,(Royal Institute of Philosophy Supplements,15) Cambridge University Press, (1983)
- (ed.) Philosophy and literature (Royal Institute of Philosophy Supplements,16) (1984)
- (ed.) Philosophy and practice (Royal Institute of Philosophy lecture series: 18) (1985)
- (ed.) Contemporary French philosophy (Royal Institute of Philosophy lecture series: 21) (1987)
- (ed.) Key themes in philosophy (Royal Institute of Philosophy lecture series: 24) (1989)
- (ed.) Wittgenstein centenary essays (Royal Institute of Philosophy Supplements, 28) (1991)
- (ed.) A.J. Ayer: Memorial Essays (Royal Institute of Philosophy Supplements, 30) (1992)
- (ed.) The Impulse to Philosophise (Royal Institute of Philosophy Supplements, 33) (1993)
- (ed.) Ethics (Royal Institute of Philosophy Supplements, 35) (1993)
- (ed.) Philosophy, psychology and psychiatry (Royal Institute of Philosophy Supplements, 37) (1994)
