= Complimentary language and gender =

Speech act catering to positive face needs

Complimentary language is a speech act that caters to positive face needs. Positive face, according to Brown and Levinson, is "the positive consistent self-image or 'personality' (crucially including the desire that this self-image be appreciated and approved of) claimed by interactions". Many studies examine complimentary language in relation to gender because of the noticeable differences in compliment topic, explicitness, and response depending on gender of the speaker as well as the gender of the addressee. Analysts use these studies to demonstrate their theories about inherent differences between the genders and the societal impact of gender roles.

== Same-gender compliments ==
Compliment patterns appear to be quite different when the complimenter and complimentee are the same gender from when they are different genders, and differences between males and females still arise even within same-gender interactions. In data from New Zealand, it was noted that women tended to compliment each other considerably more often than men complimented each other. This statistic is reflected in further data that showed that women gave two-thirds of the recorded compliments and received three-quarters of them. Compliments between men comprised a mere 9 percent of the data. Similar patterns have been noted in studies of English speakers from other regions as well.

In written discourse, too, such patterns arose, as women tended to compliment other women more often than they complimented men, and more often than men complimented either each other or women. In one study, compliments between women numbered almost 250, while compliments between men did not even reach 50.

Janet Holmes suggests that the discrepancies in male-male and female-female complimentary language may be due to differences in perception concerning the purpose of compliments. The hypothesis is that women use compliments to build affiliations, while men use compliments to make evaluative judgments. Deborah Tannen attributes female linguistic behavior to the purpose of rapport-building, so, assuming compliments are being used as such a means, the data of complimentary language between women seems to suggest this tendency to create and strengthen affiliations is strongest between women.

Compliments are usually classified into one of four categories, depending on what they refer to: appearance, ability and performance, possessions, or personality. In New Zealand data, it is shown that women tend to compliment each other based on appearance most often. While 61 percent of the compliments between women were found to be appearance-based, only 36 percent of the compliments between men were found to compliment each other based on appearance. Additionally, only 22 percent of the compliments based on appearance that were received by men were also given by men.

Men were found to compliment each other based on possessions more often than they compliment women based on possessions. Men rarely complimented each other based on appearance in both the New Zealand and American data, but in the American data it seemed compliments based on appearance were less commonly received by men from women than in the New Zealand data.

Also in New Zealand data, apparent variation between the genders was noted among English-speakers. While women are found to use the compliment pattern, "What [noun phrase]!" (as in, "What a nice shirt!") more often than men, men are found to use a more minimal pattern of, "[adjective] [noun phrase]" (as in, "Nice car."). Thus, it is not surprising that compliments between men very rarely are found to adhere to the "What [noun phrase]!" pattern. In data of American English, only women were found to use the emphasized form, "I love…" rather than, "I like…" and this pattern was most prevalent when women were complimenting other women. Women also used intensifiers such as "really" and "very" in their compliments more than men, and women primarily used these intensifiers when addressing other women.

A study of Mandarin-speakers in Kunming, China indicated that men tend to use implicit compliments more often than women, and women tend to provide explanations and justifications for their compliments. Another study of Chinese-speakers found similar results. At 80.5 percent, women opted for explicit compliments with other women, while 57.2 percent of the compliments paid by males to other males were explicit. Conversely, men used implicit compliments for other men, at 9.5 percent, while women used implicit compliments for other women only 2.3 percent of the time. Men also chose no response, rather than accepting or declining a compliment, 28.5 percent of the time, while women chose no response only 12.8 percent of the time.

== Opposite-gender compliments ==
Studies that use data from American interactions show that male-female compliments are significantly more frequent than female-male compliments, following the general pattern that women receive the most compliments overall, whether from other women or from men. Much attention has been given to the pronounced difference in compliment topic in male-female versus female-male compliments. A particular study done on a college campus found that men gave women almost twice (52%) as many compliments on physical appearance as women gave men (26%). This tendency to praise physical attractiveness (as opposed to "skill, possession, etc.") was attributed to several theories:

1. Women were more wary of giving compliments, especially those regarding physical appearance, for fear of being interpreted as too forward and romantically assertive.
2. Alternately, men readily gave more obvious compliments. Male initiation of romantic relations is more socially acceptable, so a misinterpreted compliment would not be viewed as unnatural.
3. Men are less accustomed to respond to or expect admiration related to physical appearance that is not an expression of romantic interest. This is attributed to the relative rarity of the sincere male-male compliment in comparison to the near-ubiquitous female-female compliment.
4. There is an expectation among both genders that women place greater significance on physical appearance than do men, and would therefore be more likely to give and receive compliments based on this quality.
5. An additional explanation from Wolfson posits that in the "American pattern", since men rarely give/receive appearance-related compliments from other men and rarely receive appearance-related compliments from women, the topic of physical attractiveness is not an appropriate topic for compliments from either men or women. She notes that such compliments only occur when the male is much younger than the female.

Robin Lakoff's famous work on "women's speech" has been evaluated by Brower, Gerritsen, and DeHaan, and they found that the inventory of words that had been labeled as characteristically "women's speech" were actually used by both genders when addressing women, especially in complimentary language. What had previously been categorized as adjectives primarily used by women ("adorable", "charming","sweet", "lovely", "divine", as opposed to the neutral words "great", "terrific","cool", "neat") were found in numerous examples of men referring to or addressing women. Though still unproven, this type of "unusual" discourse further emphasizes a distinction between complimentary and regular language.

Studies that discuss opposite-sex compliments in specialized environments include Lauzen and Dozier's study on compliments on primetime sitcoms. Though by no means as natural as everyday interactions, the number and type of appearance comments between female and male characters both mirror and conflict with data from real-life studies. Most realistically accurate was that female characters were twice as likely to be recipients of appearance-based comments. Conflicting facts include the balanced number of male-female and female-male compliments based on physical appearance, as opposed to others' findings that show a clear disparity, with a higher occurrence of male-female compliments. Relatedly, the study also examined insults, in which they found that although male-male insults are more likely than male-female insults, females-female insults (and compliments) are just as frequent as female-male ones. The other specialized study concentrated on gender relations in the corporate workplace. Wolfson found that male professionals felt little hesitation in making personal compliments to female co-workers, especially as jokes. These "sexist compliments" are more frequent when the woman is the subordinate position (i.e. male boss to female secretary). However, they found no occurrences of male subordinates being spoken to in this way, either from female or male superiors.

== Compliment responses ==
Complimentary responses are governed by two contradictory conditions that must be met simultaneously, according to Pomerantz (1978).

1. Agree with the complimenter
2. Avoid self-praise

While trying to meet one condition, the complimentee will inevitably conflict with the other. Pomerantz divides American compliment responses into acceptances, agreements, rejections and disagreements.

Herbert (1986) discovered, in his analysis of 1,062 compliment responses, that not all Americans adhere to Pomerantz's conditions. Speakers were "almost twice as likely to respond with some response other than acceptance." Based on these findings Herbert questions whether native speakers of other varieties of English follow the same patterns. He compares American English with English speakers in South Africa. He found that there was a one-in-three chance of an acceptance response being used by an American speaker as opposed to a three-in-four chance of an acceptance response from a South African English speaker. Herbert and Straight (1986) base the reasoning for this difference on the respective social systems of each group. Americans tend to give more compliments in an attempt to establish solidarity; Americans then tend to refuse compliments they receive, stressing equality. In the society of South African English speakers on the other hand, solidarity among status-equals is assumed. They do not need to work to establish something that they already have, so it is easier for them to accept compliments given to them.

Just as there are differences of compliment responses among separate cultures, there are also differences among men and women within the same culture. American women tend to give and receive more compliments than men do. The idea that women's speech activity works much differently compared to that of men can be observed through compliment responses, as women often work at creating and reaffirming solidarity with compliment response strategies. Wolfson found that elaborate responses to compliments among women occur between intimate, status-unequal, and status-equal acquaintances, and that a majority of elaborate responses occurred between status-equal women.

There are major differences in how men and women perceive compliments that are given by the other sex. Shotland and Craig (1988) concluded that both sexes can differentiate between friendly behavior and sexually based behavior but that men perceive situations more sexually than women. They hypothesize that this difference in perception is due to the difference between the thresholds of sexual intent of men and women. Therefore, women misjudge interested behavior as friendly behavior because they have a high threshold of sexual intent. Men, on the other hand, misjudge friendly behavior as interested behavior because they have a low threshold for sexual intent. This difference in threshold levels affects the subject matter of compliments given between men and women as well as how they respond to the compliments given.

== Cross-cultural overview of compliments ==
There is much variation regarding how compliments function and are performed in different societies. Compliments as an expression of approval is just one general description; however, as discussed above, how such politeness strategies are exhibited can vary according to the values of the society in which they are performed. The different notions of gender roles within a given society seems to have a bearing on both the frequency and style of compliments delivered in conversation.

=== American English ===
According to studies carried out by Manes and Wolfson, compliments in American culture are expressed quite frequently in conversation in attempt to achieve and maintain successful social relationships with others. Often for those whose first language is not American English, they find American English speakers rude or overbearing with giving compliments, particularly when coming from a society where humility is highly valued. Across society, men and women compliment each other freely and seemingly often about an array of topics and in various social contexts.

=== Spanish speakers ===
Many studies have looked at the use of piropos carried out by Spanish-speaking men to compliment a woman's physical beauty and attributes. Zena Moore concluded that to many American English speakers these speech acts are seen to be sexist and closely related to machismo. Despite the negative perception among American English speakers, the term and its usage are widely recognized in Hispanic culture. There is no direct translation into English for the term, but an example of its use may be as explicit as commenting on a woman's sexual desirability, or may be poetic in nature, often focusing on a woman's eyes. Moore highlights that piropos are embedded in long cultural traditions and generally received with positivity by Hispanic women.

=== Turkish speakers ===
Studies of compliments in Turkish again draw attention to compliments as a politeness strategy that helps maintain social relations. A study by Arin Bayraktaraglu and Maria Sifianou described compliments in Turkish as formulaic and occurring mostly in friendly situations. Age and marital status seems to have a great bearing on compliments given. Men who are married and above 40 years old compliment women more on accomplishments and personal attributes, whereas young adult men compliment women more on appearance and physical attributes. The results of this study were consistent with Holmes's previous findings that women compliment and are complimented more, particularly on appearance, which accounted for 58 percent of the compliments women received.

=== Chinese speakers ===
Speakers of Chinese seem to have a very deflective approach to praise and compliments, and in comparison to American English speakers, may compliment one another in conversation less frequently. Chinese culture highly values the group over the individual, as well as modesty. As a means of reinforcing one's humility, Chinese speakers tend to respond to a compliment by rejecting it or lowering themselves by returning the compliment back to the original speaker. Wolfson (1984) noted that it is often inappropriate for a man to compliment a Chinese woman on her physical attributes, especially if they do not have a close relationship. A study by Gabriele Kasper found that over 80% of Chinese speaking women from her sample gave more explicit compliments and responses in comparison to less than half of the men.
