= Synthetic personality =

Constructed friendly persona

A synthetic personality is a constructed, friendly, approachable persona, often used in broadcast media. The term was initiated by Andrew Tolson, and is related to face and politeness theory.

Tolson focuses upon how the speech genre of chat is found across many broadcasts, including interviews. He identifies three features:

1. topical shift towards the 'personal'
2. the shift may be accompanied by displays of wit
3. opens up the possibility of transgression (the interviewee asking the interviewer questions)

He describes an interview between Robin Day and Margaret Thatcher in which the discourse about the general election shifts to the personal.

== See also ==
- Critical discourse analysis
