= Face negotiation theory =

Theory in social science

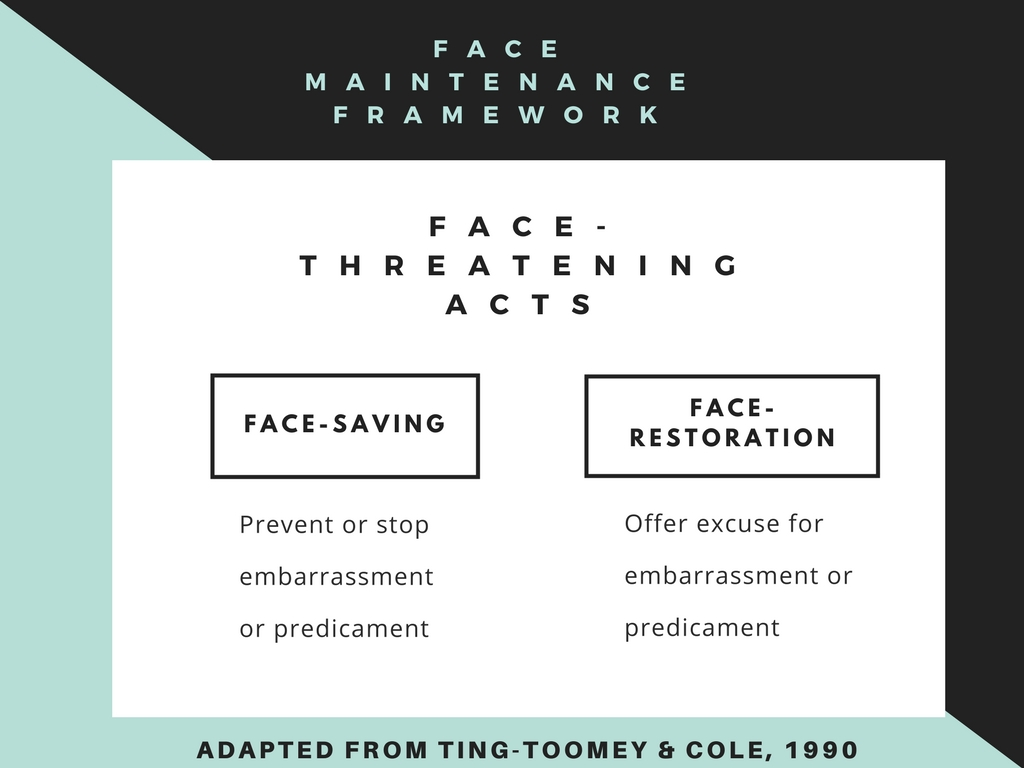
Face Negotiation Theory: Face-Maintenance Framework

Face negotiation theory is a theory conceived by Stella Ting-Toomey in 1985, to understand how people from different cultures manage rapport and disagreements. The theory posited "face", or self-image when communicating with others, as a universal phenomenon that pervades across cultures. In conflicts, one's face is threatened; and thus the person tends to save or restore his or her face. This set of communicative behaviors, according to the theory, is called "facework". Since people frame the situated meaning of "face" and enact "facework" differently from one culture to the next, the theory poses a cross-cultural framework to examine facework negotiation. The definition of face varies depending on the people and their culture and the same can be said for the proficiency of facework. According to Ting-Toomey's theory, most cultural differences can be divided by Eastern and Western cultures, and her theory accounts for these differences.

== Background ==
In this theory, "face" is a metaphor for self-image, which originated from two Chinese conceptualizations: lien and mien-tzu. Lien is the internal moral face that involves shame, integrity, debasement, and honor issues. Mien-tzu, on the other hand, is the external social face that involves social recognition, position, authority, influence and power.

Erving Goffman also situated "face" in contemporary Western research and conceptualized the terms lien and mien-tzu as identity and ego. He noted that face is a concern for one's projected image that is both immediate and spontaneous and is tied to the dynamics of social interaction. Goffman also notes that face is a part of a performance, in which performance is day-to-day activity that each individual uses to influence others. In a way, Western society views face as a marketable asset. The performance of "face" can be for the good of others or it can be for the good of one's self. Correspondingly, "facework" denotes actions taken to maintain consistency between the self and public line. The two forms of facework include restorative and preventive. Restorative facework is the act of reinstating face after the loss of it has taken place; the preventive face is the act of communicating to safeguard the threat of face being lost. Further research by Penelope Brown and Stephen Levinson on politeness suggests that the desire for face is a universal concern. Brown and Levinson further suggested that face can refer to two wants of the individual- the positive face that necessitates approval by others and the negative face that requires that one's actions or thoughts are unimpeded by others. Thus participant's wants are of more importance than the interaction itself in a face-saving view of politeness. In fact, researchers Brown and Levinson posit that face is something that "is emotionally invested, and can be lost, maintained, or enhanced, and must be constantly attended to in interaction". Levinson and Brown did not, however, address culture-specific norms, which is why Ting-Toomey decided to do so in this theory.

Ting-Toomey expanded this thinking and conceptualized face as an individual's claimed sense of favorable social self-image in a relational and network context. Facework is defined as clusters of communicative behaviors that are used to enact self-face and to uphold, challenge/threaten, or support the other person's face. In other words, facework is the sum of all messages received by someone that helps them gain or lose face.

With these concepts and frameworks, the face-negotiation theory investigates intercultural conflict styles. The perceived or actual conflict differences revolved around three issues: content, relational, and identity. Content conflict refers to the substantive issues external to the individual involved. Relational conflict refers to how individuals define, or would like to define, the particular relationship in that particular conflict episode. The identity-based conflict concerns issues of identity confirmation-rejection, respect-disrespect, and approval-disapproval. In this way, identity issues are tied closely to culture-based face-orientation factors. A face-threatening episode is an identity expectancy violation episode. Thus, the face-negotiation theory views conflict, intercultural conflict in particular, as a situation that demands active facework management from the two interdependent conflict parties. It can also be noted that in face-negotiation, individuals negotiate face not only with others but with themselves, as well.

The theory has gone through multiple iterations since its creation. There is a 1988 version of seven assumptions and 12 propositions, a 1998 version of seven assumptions and 32 propositions, and, most recently, the 2005 version of seven assumptions and 24 propositions.

== Components ==
=== Individualism vs. collectivism ===
To understand Ting-Toomey’s theory, it is important to understand the difference between individualistic and collectivistic cultures. The phrase originates from Geert Hofstede’s Culture’s Consequences. In the book, Hofstede uses individualism and collectivism as one of the four dimensions that vary between cultures. In Ting-Toomey’s theory of face negotiation theory, individualism and collectivism are one of the main differences between Eastern and Western cultures.

Individualistic cultures are less common than collectivistic cultures, as they make up only about a third of the world. According to psychology professor Harry Triandis, the three ways to tell apart individualistic and collectivistic cultures are through self, goals, and duty.

In individualistic cultures, people are more likely to focus on themselves rather than any groups they are involved in. A self-introduction would look simply like the name of the person, their age, etc. In collectivistic cultures, some of the most important aspects of the self are the groups they are involved in. Those from collectivistic cultures are more likely to define themselves by any group affiliation they find themselves in. Those from individualistic cultures focus on their own personal goals, rather than how those from collectivistic cultures want to achieve goals for their groups. To an individualistic culture, it would be unusual to think about pride in one's company over pride in oneself. Finally, those raised in collectivistic cultures are more likely to be sacrificial in their duty to others, unlike those raised individualistic. Collectivistic cultures have an emphasis on family dynamics and the duty one has to their loved ones. Meanwhile, people from individualistic cultures will feel less of a duty towards their family because they were likely not socialized with traditional family values.

=== Assumptions ===
Face and facework are universal phenomena. The Face-Negotiation Theory perspective stresses the impact of culture on the situated meaning of face and the enactment of facework. Thus, the theory assumes that:

1.Those from any culture practice facework whenever communicating.

Examples:

•Humans constantly maintain upkeep for their self-image no matter if they practice self-face upkeep or other-face upkeep.

•In professional settings, employees in Western cultures (e.g., the United States, Germany) may emphasize direct communication and assertiveness to maintain self-face, while employees in East Asian cultures (e.g., Japan, China) may employ indirect communication strategies, such as silence or deference, to maintain other-face and group harmony.

2.Face is problematic when identities are questioned.

Examples:

•Questioning someone's position or place in a group setting can create face-threatening situations.

•In online interactions, particularly on social media, individuals may experience face threats when their opinions are challenged publicly, leading to defensive communication strategies such as justification, denial, or aggression.

3.Differences in individualistic vs. collectivistic and small vs. large power distance cultures profoundly shape face management.

Examples:

•The way we communicate with others depends on how we communicate with leaders and the groups we fit in to.

•In a conflict at work, an American employee (individualistic, small power distance) may prefer direct confrontation to resolve the issue, while a Chinese employee (collectivistic, large power distance) may use mediation or an indirect approach to preserve group harmony.

4.Individualistic cultures prefer self-oriented facework while collectivistic cultures prefer other-oriented facework.

Examples:

•Individuals from individualistic cultures are more likely to protect their own faces during threatening social situations. Meanwhile, those from collectivistic cultures integrate their face with the face of others involved in threatening social situations (less "every man for himself").

•If an employee from the U.S. receives negative feedback in a meeting, they might defend their actions to maintain their self-face. In contrast, an employee from Japan might accept the criticism quietly and focus on restoring the group’s collective face.

5.Small power distance cultures prefer an "individuals are equal" framework, whereas large power distance cultures prefer a hierarchical framework.

Examples:

•These differences are often seen in the political climate of each of the different power distance cultures.

•In Sweden (small power distance), employees may openly give feedback to their manager, as face concerns are minimal. In contrast, in Mexico (large power distance), employees may hesitate to express disagreement with their boss to avoid face-threatening situations.

6.Behavior is also influenced by cultural variances, individual, relational, and situational factors.

Example:

An Indian diplomat negotiating with a Western counterpart may adjust their communication style—using indirect speech when speaking to Eastern delegates but shifting to more direct language when dealing with Western officials.

7.Competence in intercultural communication is a culmination of knowledge and mindfulness.

Example:

A multinational business leader working in China may study the local practice of 'giving face' (e.g., showing public respect to elders and superiors) to build strong relationships and avoid unintentionally offending local partners.

=== Taxonomies ===
Face-negotiation theory primarily deals with five sets of themes: face orientation or concerns, face movements, facework interaction strategies, conflict communication styles, and face content domains. In the 2005 version of theory, the five thematic clusters are referred as "core taxonomies".

==== Face orientations ====
The orientation of face determines the focus with which the face negotiator will direct her or his attention and energy of the conflict messages. Because of different concerns, caused by different underlying cultural values, face negotiators may orient towards self-face (one's own image), other face (the other conflict party's image) or mutual face (both parties' image and/or the image of the relationship).

For example, in individualist cultures, such as the United States, Germany, and Great Britain, there is great value on personal rights, freedoms and the "do it yourself" attitude. Individualists cultures are seen as promoting independence for individuals In collectivist cultures such as Japan, Saudi Arabia, and Colombia, more value is placed on "we" vs. "I". The needs of the group outweigh the needs of the individual, making independence or individualism viewed as selfish. One-third of the world lives in an individualist society, while the other two thirds are identified with collectivist cultures.

Face orientation also involves the concept of power distance. People from large power distance cultures accept unequal power distributions, are reliant on established hierarchy, such as age, sex, and roles, not just social rank and understand that rewards and sanctions are based on social position. People from small power distance cultures value equal power distributions, symmetric relations, and rewards and sanctions based on performance. Denmark is an example of a small power distance culture, while Japan embodies a large power distance culture; The United States is considered to be in the middle in regards to power distance.

Drawing on the research of Geert Hofstede, face-negotiation theory notes that while individualism and power distance are two separate dimensions, they are correlated. Highly individualistic cultures tend to be low in power distance, and vice versa.

Besides the cultural-level collectivism-individualism and power distance, face-negotiation also consists of the individual-level self-construal. Self-construal is an individual level of the construct in face-negotiation theory, and it can be regarded as an additional alternative to understand cross-cultural conflicts, and it is also closely related to cultural variability. There are two types of self-construal: independent self-construal and interdependent self-construal. Independent self-construal refers to the great degree to which people regard themselves as an isolated entity, whereas people who are more interdependent self-construal tend to conceive themselves as an integral part in interpersonal relationship. According to Gudykunst, in individualistic cultures, independent self-construal prevails, while in collectivistic cultures, people are more related to interdependent self-construal.

==== Face movements ====
Face movement refers to the options that a negotiator faces in choosing whether to maintain, defend and/or upgrade self-face versus other-face in a conflict episode. There are four opportunities a mediator has in regards to their concern for self-face, your personal image and other-face, the counterpart's image of themselves that define face movements:

1. If there is a high level of concern for both self-face and other-face, the result is mutual-face protection.
2. If there is a low level of concern for both self-face and other-face, the result is mutual-face obliteration.
3. If there is a high level of concern for self-face but a low level of concern for other-face, the result is self-face defense.
4. If there is a high level of concern for other-face but a low level of concern for self-face, the result is other-face defense.

Ting-Toomey asserts that several conditions must be perceived as severe in order for a negotiator to feel his face is threatened; the importance of the culturally approved facework that is violated, feelings of mistrust because of a large distance between cultures, the importance of the conflict topic, the power distance between the two parties, and the perception of the parties as outgroup members are all conditions which must be made salient for face-threatening communication to occur. Whether or not a person engages in a conflict depends on how face-threatening the situation is perceived.

In an individualistic culture, the more self-face threatening the conflict, the more likely the individual will engage in an attack. In a collectivistic culture, where mutual-face concern is important, avoidance of conflict may prevail in order for the situation to be defused. Collectivistic communicators may also require a third-party negotiation to make progress in finding a resolution.

==== Facework interaction strategies ====
On a broad level, individualistic cultures operate with a more direct, low context facework with importance placed on verbal communication and nonverbal gestures for emphasis. Collectivistic cultures operate in a more indirect, high context facework emphasizing nonverbal subtleties. There are three prevalent facework strategies: dominating, avoiding, and integrating. Dominating facework is characterized by trying to maintain a credible image with the goal of winning the conflict. Avoiding facework attempts to preserve harmony in the relationship by dealing with the conflict indirectly. Integrating facework focuses on content resolution and maintaining the relationship.

Along the face concern-orientation dimension, facework is at play before (preventive), during, and after (restorative) the situation. Preventive facework is an attempt to minimize face-loss before the threat occurs. Preventive strategies include credentialing, appealing for suspended judgment, pre-disclosure, pre-apology, hedging, and disclaimers. Collectivistic cultures tend to employ more preventive strategies than individualistic cultures. Restorative facework attempts to repair face that was lost. Restorative strategies include excuses, justifications, direct aggression, humor, physical remediation, passive aggressiveness, avoidance, and apologies. Individualistic cultures are more likely to use restorative facework than collectivistic cultures.

Facework differs from conflict styles by employing face-saving strategies which can be used prior to, during, or after a conflict episode and can be used in a variety of identity-threatening and identity-protection situations. These strategies are focused on relational and face identity beyond conflict goal issues. Conflict styles are specific strategies used to engage or disengage from a conflict situation. Preventive and restorative face-work strategies are typically employed when one's face is being threatened.

==== Conflict communication styles ====
Conflict style consists of learned behaviors developed through socialization within one's culture. Rahim based his classification of conflict styles into two dimensions. The first dimension demonstrates the concern for self, how important it is for the individual to maintain their own face or that of their culture (this is rated on a high to low continuum) and the second is concern for others, how important is it to the individual to help them maintain their own face (also rated on a high to low continuum). The two dimensions are combined to create five styles for dealing with conflict. The individual will choose a style of handling conflict based on the importance of saving their face and that of the face of the other.

1. Dominating: One person's position or goal above the other.
2. Avoiding: Eluding the conflict topic, the conflict party, or the conflict situation altogether.
3. Obliging: High concern for the other person's conflict interest above a person's own interest.
4. Compromising: A give-and-take concession approach in order to reach a midpoint agreement.
5. Integrating: A solution closure that involves high concern for one's self and high concern for the other.

In 2000 Ting-Toomey, Oetzel, and Yee-Jung incorporated three additional conflict communication styles to the original five. These three have further enhanced conflict communication across cultures.

1. Emotional Expression-Articulating a person's feelings in order to deal with and control conflict.
2. Third Party Help-Resolving conflicts by enlisting additional help to manage communication.
3. Passive Aggressive-Reacting to conflict in a roundabout way, placing blame indirectly.

Other researchers used a different way to group the conflict tactics. Ting-Toomey (1983) grouped strategies into three categories of tactics for handling conflict; integrative, distributive and passive-indirect.

Integrative conflict tactics incorporated integrating and compromising styles and is reflective of mutual-face and the need for a solution. Those who chose this tactic work with the other person involved in the conflict to get the best possible solution for both parties. Examples of Integrative tactics may include listening to the other, respecting their feelings, and providing their own personal viewpoints in a manner that assists in the negotiation.

Distributive conflict tactics use the dominating style of handling conflict, and emphasizes the individuals own power over the other. This style reflects self-face. Passive-indirect conflict tactics are consistent with obliging and avoiding styles of handling conflict and reflects other-face.

==== Face content domains ====
Face content domains refer to the different topics an individual will engage in facework on. Individuals have different face wants or face needs in a diverse range of communicative situations. There are six domains that an individual will operate in:

1. Autonomy-represents our need for others to acknowledge our independence, self-sufficiency, privacy, boundary, nonimposition, control issues, and our consideration of other's autonomy face needs
2. Inclusion-our need to be recognized as worthy companions, likeable, agreeable, pleasant, friendly, cooperative
3. Status-need for others to admire our tangible and intangible assets or resources: appearance, attractiveness, reputation, position, power, and material worth
4. Reliability-need for others to realize that we are trustworthy, dependable, reliable, loyal, and consistent in words and actions
5. Competence-need for others to recognize our qualities or social abilities such as intelligence, skills, expertise, leadership, team-building, networking, conflict mediation, facework, and problem-solving skills
6. Moral-need for others to respect our sense of integrity, dignity, honor, propriety, and morality.

===== Usage =====
Before starting a negotiation with a party above are the basic details to concern to make the negotiation win-win state. To begin negotiation, negotiator should start to absorb the reaction of the party and then try to brainstorm with the prepared checklist of concern to find the interest areas of the party to initialize the role to attain the goal.

=== Theoretical propositions ===
The heart of Face Negotiation Theories are 24 propositions. They are based on the seven assumptions and five taxonomies that have been proven in numerous cases and studies. They describe facework on three levels of communication: cultural, individual, and situational.

Cultural-level propositions

1. Individualistic cultures predominantly express self-face maintenance interests than collectivistic culture members do.
2. Collectivistic cultures are more concerned with other-face maintenance than members of individualistic cultures.
3. Members of collectivist cultures are more concerned with mutual-face maintenance than individualistic cultures.
4. Members of individualistic cultures predominantly use direct and dominating facework strategies in conflict
5. Collectivistic cultures tend to use avoidance strategies more than individualistic cultures do.
6. Members of collectivistic cultures use more integrative facework strategies than individualistic culture members do.
7. Individualistic cultures prefer dominating/competing conflict styles more than collectivistic cultures do.
8. Individualistic cultures use more emotionally expressive conflict styles than collectivistic cultures do.
9. Individualistic cultures use more aggressive conflict styles than members of collectivistic cultures.
10. Collectivistic cultures use more avoidance techniques than members of individualistic cultures.
11. Collectivistic cultures use more obliging conflict styles than members of individualistic cultures.
12. Collectivistic cultures utilize compromising styles of conflict more than members of individualistic cultures.

Individual-level propositions

1. Independent self is positively associated with self-face concern.
2. Interdependent self is positively associated with other-/mutual-face concern.
3. Self-face maintenance is associated with dominating/competing conflict style.
4. Other-face maintenance is associated with avoiding/obliging conflict style.
5. Other-face maintenance is associated with compromising/integrating conflict style.
6. Independent self–construal is associated with dominating/competing conflict style.
7. Interdependent self-construal is associated with obliging/avoiding.
8. Interdependent self-construal is associated with compromising/integrating.
9. Bi-construal is associated with compromising/integrating.
10. Ambivalent is associated with neglect/third-party.

Situational-level propositions

1. Individualist or independent-self personalities tend to express a greater degree of self-face maintenance concerns and less other-face maintenance concern in dealing with both ingroup and outgroup conflicts situations.
2. Collectivist or interdependent-self personalities express a greater degree of other-face concerns with ingroup members and a greater degree of self-face maintenance concerns with outgroup members in intergroup conflict situations.

=== Intercultural facework competence ===
Reflecting on the final assumption, intercultural facework competence consists of another component of face-negotiation theory. Facework competence is conceptualized as an optimal integration of knowledge, mindfulness and communication skills in managing self's and other's face-related concerns. To act competently in an intercultural conflict episode, the theory posits that individuals have to enhance their cultural knowledge and mindfulness in applying context-sensitive facework interaction skills.

==== Knowledge dimension ====
Knowledge here refers to the process of in-depth understanding of phenomenon via a range of information gained through conscious learning and personal experiences. Building block concepts include: (1) individualism-collectivism, (2) power distance. (3) two contrastive "self/face" models, and (4) facework communication styles.

==== Mindfulness dimension ====
Mindfulness means attending to one's internal assumptions, cognitions and emotions and simultaneously attuning attentively to the other's assumptions, cognitions and emotions while focusing the five senses. To be mindful of intercultural facework differences, we have to learn to see the unfamiliar behavior from a fresh context. Thus, on a general level, mindfulness demands creative thinking and living.

== Applications ==
As an intercultural communication theory, face-negotiation theory was first tested in and applied to the field of intercultural training and conflicts. However, researchers from other areas also find this theory applicable and relevant. Recent applications and examinations of the theory include following studies.

=== Intercultural conflict training ===
One direct application of face-negotiation theory is the design of intercultural conflict training frameworks. Part of the objective of face-negotiation theory, according to Ting-Toomey, is in fact to translate the theory into a viable framework for mindful intercultural conflict training. Ting-Toomey suggests that this theory can be most useful when it comes to application of the theory to intercultural training across cultures.

More specifically, intercultural conflict training revolves around international business negotiation, intercultural conflict mediation, managing intercultural miscommunication, and developing intercultural conflict competencies. Adapting face-negotiation theory, and also in combination with various communication researches such as Critical Incident, Intergroup Negotiation Simulation etc., Ting-Toomey designed a detailed three-day training session. Agenda outline, along with in class activities, lecture themes, and exercises, is provided in her design as well.

=== Face concerns in interpersonal conflict ===
This study by the author of the theory Stella Ting-Toomey and, Department of communication and Journalism at the University of New Mexico, John G. Oetzel was done in order to discover if face was indeed a factor in determining "culture's influence on conflict behavior" (Ting-Toomey & Oetzel, 2003). There were 768 people from four different countries who partook in the study. The cultures represented were China, Germany, Japan, and the United States. China and Japan representing the collectivist countries and Germany and the United States as the individualist countries. Each contributor was given a survey in which they were to explain interpersonal conflict. The largest findings are as follows.

1. "Cultural individualism-collectivism had direct and indirect effects on conflict styles."
2. "Independent self-construal related positively with self-face and interdependent self-construal related positively with other-face."
3. "Self-face related positively with dominating conflict styles and other-face related positively with avoiding and integrating styles."
4. "Face accounted for all of the total variance explained (100% of 19% total explained) in dominating, most of the total variance explained in integrating (70% of 20% total explained) when considering face concerns, cultural individualism-collectivism, and self-construals."

=== Face and facework in conflicts with parents and siblings ===
This study, implemented by the author of this theory Stella Ting-Toomey, John Oetzel, Martha Idalia Chew-Sanchez, Richard Harris, Richard Wilcox, and Siegfried Stumpf, observed how facework in conflict with parents and siblings is affected by culture, self-concept, and power distance. There were 449 people from four different countries and cultures that participated. Germany, Japan, Mexico, and the United States were the countries used in the study. The survey looked at 3 apprehensions of face and 11 behaviors of "facework". The results are as follows.

1. "Self-construals had strong effects on face concerns and facework with independence positively associated with self-face and dominating facework and interdependence positively associated with other- and mutual-face and integrating and avoiding facework behaviors."
2. "Power distance had small, positive effects on self-face, other-face, avoiding facework, and dominating facework."
3. "National culture had small to medium effects with individualistic, small power distance cultures having more self-face and mutual-face and using more dominating and integrating facework and less avoiding facework."
4. "Germans have more self-face and used defending more than U.S. Americans."
5. "Japanese used more expression than Mexicans."
6. "Individuals in conflict with parents were more likely to use respect and expression and less likely to use aggression, pretend, and third party than individuals in conflict with siblings."

=== Face negotiation with mothers ===
Motherhood of the Construction of "Mommy Identity" – Heisler & Ellis Face Negotiation Theory suggests that, "USA culture simultaneously encourages connection and autonomy among individuals." Mothers do not want to be vulnerable so there is a "face" that is developed in the culture of mothers. Heisler and Ellis did a study on the "face" and reasons for face in motherhood. The results portrayed that the main reasons for keeping "face" in a culture of mothers are:

1. Acceptance and approval: There is a fear of criticism and rejection by others. There is the avoidance face which deflects others attention. Acceptance face attracts attention.
2. Personal Reasons: There are many internal pressures that mothers face. These include the guilt that they do not spend enough time with their children, insecurities and values they have are not being in met, and their self-esteem is low because of the fear of judgment.
3. Mentoring/helping others: Mothers put on a face in order to appear as a good mother figure to younger mothers that look up to them. There are cultural expectations that can contribute to personal expectations for how mothers should act. Women's thoughts on mothering are not their own original ideas. They take on a lot of societal pressures. An example would be, if a mother's child acts poorly in public, it makes the mother look bad.

Motherhood and "face": Results from the same study showed that mothers participate in "Mommy face work." Depending on who they are talking to or interacting with. Mothers said to put on their highest face with friends, spouses, mothers and other family members. This is not to say that mother's plan to be deceptive, but they feel more comfortable not showing weakness and hide it accordingly.

=== Physician communication in the operating room ===
Kristin Kirschbaum applied face-negotiation theory to the health communication context, and specifically in the operating room environment. In the research, a survey was administered to anesthesiologists and surgeons at a teaching hospital in the southwestern United States to measure three variables commonly associated with face-negotiation theory: conflict-management style, face concern, and self-construal. The results strongly support the theory, and significant positive correlations were found between independent self-construal and self-face concern for anesthesiologists and surgeons. Specific to this health communication context, the research shows differences between the two groups of operating-room physicians: surgeons are potentially more other-face oriented and that anesthesiologists are potentially more independently oriented. Further, both anesthesiologists and surgeons recognize the importance of collaboration as surgical team members.

The survey also found that specific terms were contextually inappropriate for this population, e.g. the terms pride, dignity, or credibility demonstrated a need for error correlation. This suggests unique considerations of language. Along this line of thinking, the research recommended physician communication training to address both unique language considerations and different orientations to face concern and self-construal.

=== Safe sex negotiation ===
Gust Yep, noticing the potential vulnerability and emotional volatility of sexual interaction, applied face-negotiation theory to the safe sex negotiation context.

The study integrated various components of face-negotiation theory, and eight propositions are derived from empirical testing in intimate communication scenarios including east–west romantic dyads. The research is based on preliminary observations on personal interviews with two Asian women, aiming to predict intimate communication patterns between Asian women and Euro-American men. Specifically, low-high context and individualism-collectivism frameworks are used to draw the eight propositions.

=== Face saving in business request emails ===
A study conducted on the exchange of business emails between Chinese & American business associates presented how the structure of email requests affected the person's face & impacted how the associates viewed the request. It was observed that direct requests in an email threatened the face of the recipient & sender. It resulted in loss of face because the recipient was denied autonomy and acted in a socially unacceptable manner.

=== Face negotiation and online gift-giving ===
Research into the world of community gift-giving on livestream services found that face plays a role in purchases on live video streaming platforms. Consumer competitive arousal, gift design aesthetics, and broadcaster's image all make a difference in an audience's decision to purchase these gifts for livestreamers. Though research found it is easy to make purchasing decisions online, face plays a role in moderating how much someone is willing to give gifts to a person on a livestream.

=== Face threat and disability ===
Research was conducted to gauge how disabled persons interact with able bodied individuals with regards to protecting one's face and self-identity. The study considered students with not only physical disability but also disabilities not visually identifiable such as heart conditions and hearing impairment. Those with disabilities were threatened by the way others treated them and hence they chose more face-saving strategies. For instance, communication apprehension was noted in students with a hearing impairment and they reported less disclosure in the conversation. In fact, the study found that disabled students viewed asking help from able bodied individuals as a face threatening act.

=== Responding to unethical communication ===
Research on people's reaction to unethical communication revealed that people use face-threatening acts in order to counter the apprehension in communication. According to Bisel et al. (2011), "denying unethical communication challenges both positive and negative face of the hearer”. An expression of disapproval threatens a person's positive face which indicates the hearer's need for approval and it impacts the person's negative face because it affects the person's autonomy.

The study put forth a research question of associating politeness strategies and unethical communication. The strategies considered were don't’ do the face threatening act, negative politeness, positive politeness and bald on strategy. The unethical communication was classified as one that was either deceptive, manipulative, exploitative, intrusive or coercive. The ideal strategic responses have been highlighted in the figure.

=== Face saving in artwork reviews ===
A research was conducted to study the use of face saving and face threatening acts in reviewing artwork. For the study, twelve reviews from the periodical Literatūra ir menas (Literature and Art) were randomly selected. The source for the research analysis was between 1970 -1975.

It was observed that reviewers generally had the face of the artist in mind before presenting their reviews. When presenting a negative review, reviewers threatened the positive face of the artist and hence also presented positive feedback in order to ‘save face’ of the artist.

=== Face concerns and the intent to apologize ===
A study was conducted among 317 Chinese and American participants to determine how the cultural variation between the two affected the intention to apologize. The cultural norms were categorized as the individualistic and collectivist cultures. According to Hofstede (1980), an individualistic culture lays emphasis on the identity of the “I” while collectivist cultures place more importance on the “we” and the harmony in groups.

This study also took into account culture when trying to understand the intention to apologize. Apology, according to Goffman (1971), is the “offender's device to remedy a social breach and to re-establish social harmony”.

The cultural differences were more prominent especially as the intention took into account if the member (whose face was threatened by an act and thus necessities an apology) was an in-group or an out-group member. The study thus found that Chinese participants had a greater intention to apologize especially if their act threatened the positive face of the other individual. On the other hand, the U.S. participants had the intention to apologize when their act threatened the negative face of the person.

=== Face concerns, self-construal and Forgiveness ===
Ting-Toomey and other researchers conducted a latest research in 2019 on the effects of the three main individual-level constituents of face-negotiation: face concerns, self-construal and apology on victims’ choice of forgiveness, reconciliation and revenge to offenders. It is a study on relational transgressions in two different cultures: the high-context communication of China, and the low-context communication of United States. Participants of this study include 327 college students in United States and 176 college students in central China. The researchers compared five hypotheses on relationship between the central constructs of face-negotiation theory and victims’ behavioral consequences. The final result indicates a negative relationship between self-face concern and forgiveness, independent self-construal and forgiveness in both cultures. It also suggests a positive association between other-face concern and forgiveness, interdependent self-construal and forgiveness, offender apology and forgiveness in both countries.

== See also ==
- Effective group decision-making
