= Politeness =

Practical application of good manners or etiquette so as not to offend others

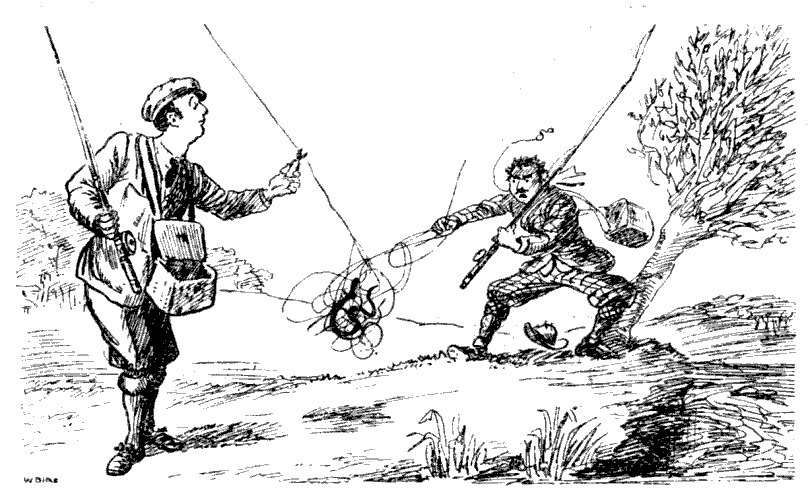
True Politeness. "Your eel, I think, Sir?" Cartoon in Punch magazine: 28 July 1920

Politeness is the practical application of good manners or etiquette so as not to offend others and to put them at ease. It is a culturally defined phenomenon, and therefore what is considered polite in one culture can sometimes be quite rude or simply eccentric in another cultural context.

While the goal of politeness is to refrain from behaving in an offensive way so as not to offend others, and to make all people feel relaxed and comfortable with one another, these culturally defined standards at times may be broken within the context of personal boundaries – this is known as positive politeness.

== Types ==
Anthropologists Penelope Brown and Stephen Levinson identified four kinds of politeness, deriving from Erving Goffman's concept of face:

1. Negative politeness is the act of making a request less infringing, such as "If you don't mind..." or "If it isn't too much trouble..."; respects a person's right to act freely. This is a variety of deference. There is a greater use of indirect speech acts. It is also considered a part of being assertive.
2. Non-assertive politeness is when a person refrains from making a comment or asserting their beliefs during a discussion so as to remain polite to others present. It is also when a person goes along with a decision made by someone else so as not to appear impolite, essentially following general social norms.
3. Assertive politeness can be when a person offers their opinion in a positive and constructive way to be assistive and helpful during an interaction, or refrains from purporting to agree with something they do not actually agree with in a way that does not offend others.
4. Positive politeness seeks to establish a positive relationship between parties, and it respects a person's need to be liked and understood. This standard of politeness is determined by personal boundaries, and often violates etiquette norms in letter. Direct speech acts, swearing and flouting Grice's maxims can be considered aspects of positive politeness because:
  - They show an awareness that the relationship is strong enough to cope with what would normally be considered impolite (in the popular understanding of the term);
  - They articulate an awareness of the other person's values, which fulfills the person's desire to be accepted. This can include an awareness that the other person does not mind a nominally offensive behavior, such as casually swearing in front of someone one just met.
  - They convey a natural, relaxed, casual setting, where all parties are comfortable and uninhibited.

Some cultures, groups, and individuals prefer some ideals of politeness over the other. In this way, politeness is culturally bound, and even within broader cultures, people may disagree.

== History ==
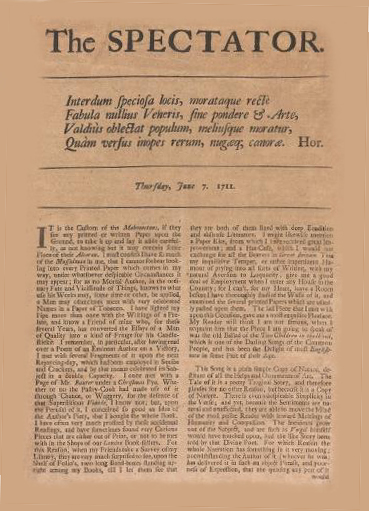
The Spectator fostered a culture of politeness among the middle-classes of early 18th century England.

During the Enlightenment era, a self-conscious process of the imposition of polite norms and behaviors became a symbol of being a genteel member of the upper class. Upwardly mobile middle class bourgeoisie increasingly tried to identify themselves with the elite through their adopted artistic preferences and their standards of behavior. They became preoccupied with precise rules of etiquette, such as when to show emotion, the art of elegant dress and graceful conversation and how to act courteously, especially with women. Influential in this new discourse was a series of essays on the nature of politeness in a commercial society, penned by the philosopher Lord Shaftesbury in the early 18th century. Shaftesbury defined politeness as the art of being pleasing in company: "'Politeness' may be defined a dext'rous management of our words and actions, whereby we make other people have better opinion of us and themselves."

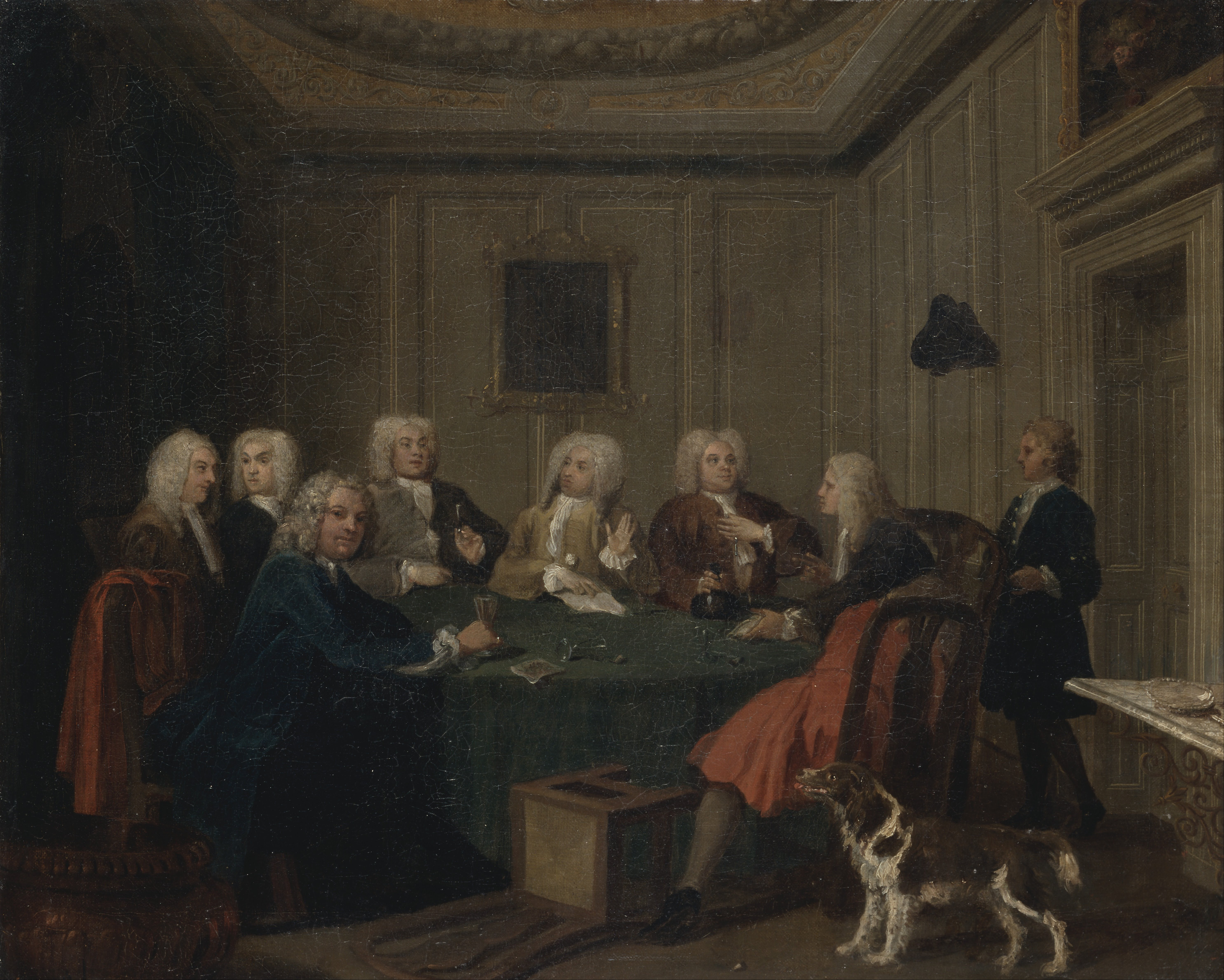
Members of a Gentlemen's club had to conform to a socially acceptable standard of politeness. The painting, A Club of Gentlemen by Joseph Highmore c. 1730.

Periodicals, such as The Spectator, founded as a daily publication by Joseph Addison and Richard Steele in 1711, gave regular advice to its readers on how to be a polite gentleman. Its stated goal was "to enliven morality with wit, and to temper wit with morality ... to bring philosophy out of the closets and libraries, schools and colleges, to dwell in clubs and assemblies, at tea-tables and coffeehouses." It provided its readers with educated, topical talking points, and advice on how to carry on conversations and social interactions in a polite manner.

The art of polite conversation and debate was particularly cultivated in the coffeehouses of the period. Conversation was supposed to conform to a particular manner, with the language of polite and civil conversation considered to be essential to the conduct of coffeehouse debate and conversation. The concept of "civility" referred to a desired social interaction which valued sober and reasoned debate on matters of interest. Established rules and procedures for proper behavior, as well as conventions, were outlined by gentleman's clubs, such as Harrington's Rota Club. Periodicals, including The Tatler and The Spectator, intended to infuse politeness into English coffeehouse conversation, as their explicit purpose lay in the reformation of English manners and morals.

== Techniques ==
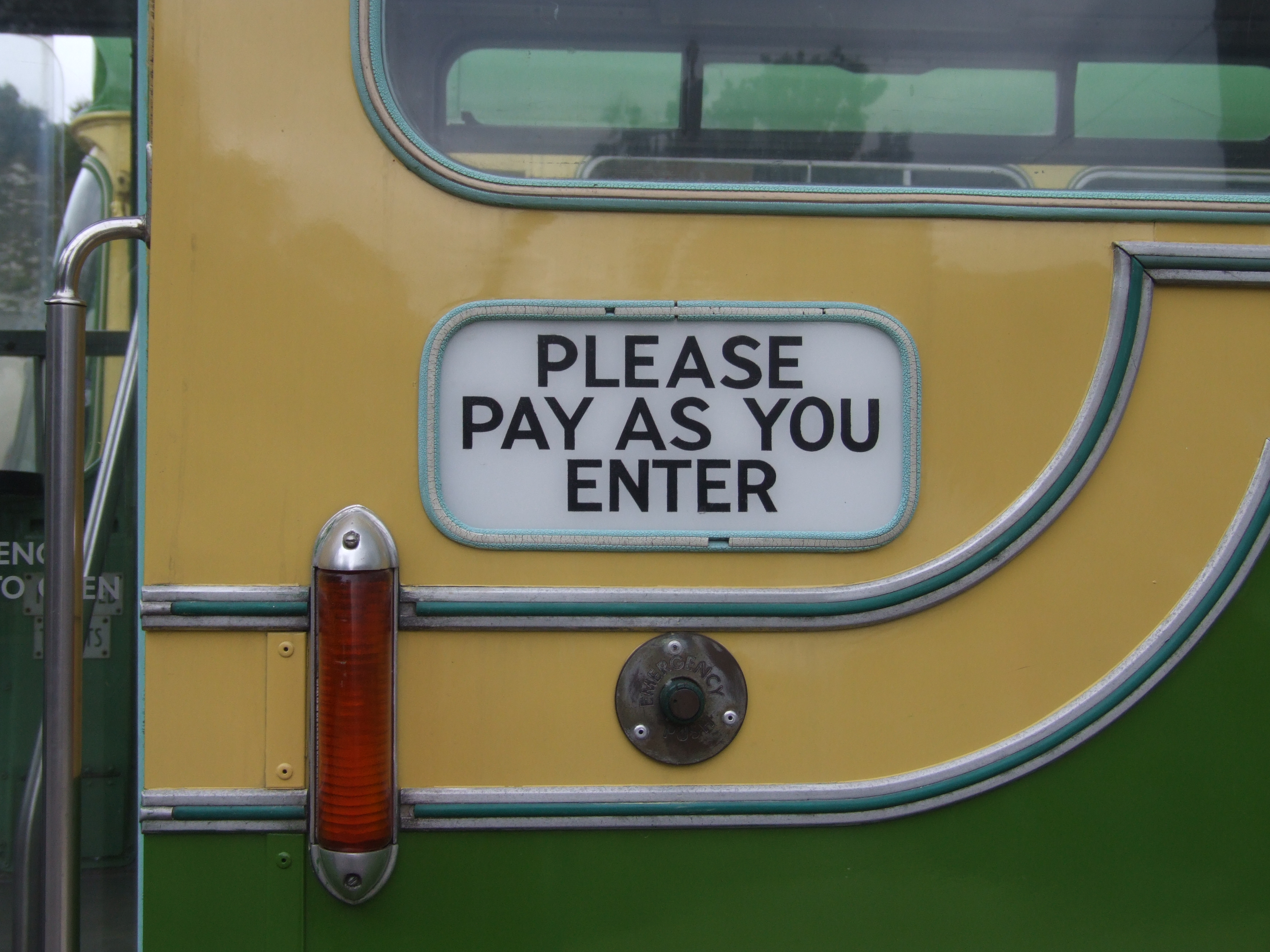
A polite notice on the side of a bus that reads "please pay as you enter"

There is a variety of techniques one can use to seem polite. Some techniques include expressing uncertainty and ambiguity through hedging and indirectness, polite lying or use of euphemisms (which make use of ambiguity as well as connotation).

Additionally, one can use tag questions to direct statements, such as "You were at the store, weren't you?" There are three types of tags: modal tags, affective tags, and facilitative tags. Modal tags request information of which the speaker is uncertain: "You haven't been to the store yet, have you?" Affective tags indicate concern for the listener: "You haven't been here long, have you?" Facilitative tags invite the addressee to comment on the request being made: "You can do that, can't you?" Finally, softeners reduce the force of what would be a brusque demand: "Hand me that thing, could you?"

Some studies have shown that women are more likely to use politeness formulas than men, though the exact differences are not clear. Most current research has shown that gender differences in politeness use are complex, since there is a clear association between politeness norms and the stereotypical speech of middle class white women, at least in the UK and US. It is therefore unsurprising that women tend to be associated with politeness more and their linguistic behavior judged in relation to these politeness norms.

== Linguistic devices ==
Besides and additionally to the above, many languages have specific means to show politeness, deference, respect, or a recognition of the social status of the speaker and the hearer. There are two main ways in which a given language shows politeness: in its lexicon (for example, employing certain words in formal occasions, and colloquial forms in informal contexts), and in its morphology (for example, using special verb forms for polite discourse). The T–V distinction is a common example in Western languages, while some Asian languages extend this to avoiding pronouns entirely. Some languages have complex politeness systems, such as Korean speech levels and honorific speech in Japanese.

Japanese is perhaps the most widely known example of a language that encodes politeness at its core. Japanese has two main levels of politeness, one for intimate acquaintances, family, and friends, and one for other groups, and verb morphology reflects these levels. Besides that, some verbs have special hyper-polite suppletive forms. This happens also with some nouns and interrogative pronouns. Japanese also employs different personal pronouns for each person according to gender, age, rank, degree of acquaintance, and other cultural factors.

== Criticism of Brown and Levinson's typology ==
Brown and Levinson's theory of politeness has been criticised as not being universally valid, by linguists working with East-Asian languages, including Japanese. Matsumoto and Ide claim that Brown and Levinson assume the speaker's volitional use of language, which allows the speaker's creative use of face-maintaining strategies toward the addressee. In East Asian cultures like Japan, politeness is achieved not so much on the basis of volition as on discernment (wakimae, finding one's place), or prescribed social norms. Wakimae is oriented towards the need for acknowledgment of the positions or roles of all the participants as well as adherence to formality norms appropriate to the particular situation.

== See also ==
- Confirmation bias
- Courtesy
- Formality
- Intercultural competence
- Polite fiction
- Politeness maxims
- Politeness theory
- Register (sociolinguistics)
- Respect
- Valediction, expression used to say farewell
