= Mitigated speech =

Linguistic term

Mitigated speech is a linguistic term describing deferential or indirect speech inherent in communication between individuals of perceived High Power Distance which has been in use for at least two decades with many published references.

The term was popularized by Canadian author Malcolm Gladwell in his book, Outliers, where he defines mitigated speech as "any attempt to downplay or sugarcoat the meaning of what is being said". He continues with reference to Fischer and Orasanu, to describe 6 degrees of mitigation with which we make suggestions to authority:

1. Command – "Strategy X is going to be implemented"
2. Team Obligation Statement – "We need to try strategy X"
3. Team Suggestion – "Why don't we try strategy X?"
4. Query – "Do you think strategy X would help us in this situation?"
5. Preference – "Perhaps we should take a look at one of these Y alternatives"
6. Hint – "I wonder if we could run into any roadblocks on our current course"

Gladwell brings up the concept in the context of how crews relate to each other in the cockpit of a commercial airliner, graphically illustrating the degree to which mitigated speech can be detrimental in high-risk situations which require clear communication.

== See also ==
- Hedge (linguistics)
- Politeness maxims
