= Soonja Choi =

South Korean linguist

Soonja Choi (Korean: 최순자) is a South Korean linguist. She specializes in language acquisition, semantics, and the linguistics of Korean.

== Education ==
Choi initially studied French language and literature, receiving her BA at Sacred Heart Women's College in Seoul in 1972 and her MA at Seoul National University in 1976. After this she went to study in France, and received a master's degree in applied linguistics from Paris-Sorbonne University (Paris IV) in 1980. Her PhD in linguistics was awarded in 1986 by SUNY Buffalo.

== Career ==
After her doctoral studies, Choi spent some time as a postdoctoral fellow at the University of Toronto in Canada, before being appointed assistant professor at San Diego State University in 1987. She remained at SDSU until her retirement, being promoted to associate professor in 1991 and full professor in 1997. In 2008, she founded the Korean Studies Program at SDSU, and she remains its senior advisor.

Choi has retained links with Europe throughout her career. From 1988 to 1996, she was active as a visiting scholar at the Max Planck Institute for Psycholinguistics in Nijmegen, The Netherlands, where she collaborated with Melissa Bowerman. Since 2012, she has also been Research Professor at the Comparative Psycholinguistics Group of the University of Vienna, Austria. In 2019 she was elected as a member of the Academia Europaea.

== Research ==
Much of Choi's research has been concerned with the first language acquisition of spatial semantics, especially motion events and spatial categories, and the relationship between language and cognition more broadly. A recurring theme, especially in work with Melissa Bowerman, has been the extent to which these domains provide evidence for or against the hypothesis of linguistic relativity. Her work has drawn on both naturalistic and experimental evidence, in particular building on comparative work on languages such as Korean, Dutch, English, French and German. More recently, she has worked on evidentiality (linguistic coding of information source) and clause chaining construction in Korean.https://sites.google.com/view/soonja-choi-ph-d-sdsu/home

== Selected publications ==
- Gopnik, Alison, and Soonja Choi. 1990. Do linguistic differences lead to cognitive differences? A cross-linguistic study of semantic and cognitive development. First Language 10, 199-215.
- Choi, Soonja, and Melissa Bowerman. 1991. Learning to express motion events in English and Korean: The influence of language-specific lexicalization patterns. Cognition 41, 83-121.
- Choi, Soonja, and Alison Gopnik. 1995. Early acquisition of verbs in Korean: a cross-linguistic study. Journal of Child Language 22, 497-529.
- Gopnik, Alison, and Soonja Choi. 1995. Names, relational words, and cognitive development in English and Korean speakers: nouns are not always learned before verbs. In Michael Tomasello and William E. Merriman (eds.), Beyond Names for Things: Young Children's Acquisition of Verbs, 63-80. New York: Erlbaum. ISBN 9781138876378
- Choi, Soonja, Laraine McDonough, Melissa Bowerman, and Jean M. Mandler. 1999. Early sensitivity to language-specific spatial categories in English and Korean. Cognitive Development 14, 241-268.
- Bowerman, Melissa, and Soonja Choi. 2001. Shaping meanings for language: universal and language-specific in the acquisition of spatial semantic categories. In Melissa Bowerman and Stephen Levinson (eds.), Language acquisition and conceptual development, 475-511. Cambridge: Cambridge University Press. ISBN 9780521593588
- Bowerman, Melissa, and Soonja Choi. 2003. Space under construction: Language-specific spatial categorization in first language acquisition. In Dedre Gentner and Susan Goldin-Meadow (eds.), Language in Mind: Advances in the Study of Language and Thought, 387-427. Cambridge, MA: MIT Press. ISBN 9780262571630
- McDonough, Laraine, Soonja Choi, and Jean M. Mandler. 2003. Understanding spatial relations: Flexible infants, lexical adults. Cognitive Psychology 46, 229-259.
- Choi, Soonja. 2006. Influence of language-specific input on spatial cognition: Categories of containment. First Language, 26 (2), 207-232.
- Choi, Soonja. 2011. Language-specificity of Motion event expressions in young Korean children. Language, Interaction & Acquisition, 2(1), 157-184.
- Choi, Soonja, and Kate Hattrup. 2012. Relative contribution of cognition/perception and language on spatial categorization. Cognitive Science, 36, 102–129.
- Yun, Hongoak, and Soonja Choi. 2018. Spatial semantics, cognition, and their interaction: A comparative study of spatial categorization in English and Korean. Cognitive Science, 42(6), 1736-1776.
- Choi, Soonja, Florian Goller, Upyong Hong, Ulrich Ansorge, and Hongoak Yun. 2018. Figure and Ground in spatial language: Evidence from German and Korean. Language and Cognition, 10, 665-700.
- Choi, Soonja. 2020. Development of clause-chaining in Korean. Frontiers of Psychology, 11:256. doi: 10.3389/fpsyg.2020.00256
- Choi, Soonja, Florian Goller, Ulrich Ansorge, Upyong Hong, and Hongoak Yun. 2022. Lexical expressions versus grammatical markers for source of information: A contrast between German and Korean. Language Sciences, 92.
- Baier, Diane, Soonja Choi, Florian Goller, Yunju Nam, and Ulrich Ansorge. 2023. Does language determine perception? Testing a radical view of linguistic relativity. Journal of Experimental Psychology: General, 152(3), 794-824. doi.org/10.1037/sge0001296
