= Politeness theory =

Social and linguistic theory of politeness

Politeness theory, proposed by Penelope Brown and Stephen Levinson, centers on the notion of politeness, construed as efforts to redress the affronts to a person's public self-image or face (as in "save face" or "lose face") in social interactions. Notable concepts include positive and negative face, the face threatening act (FTA), strategies surrounding FTAs and factors influencing the choices of strategies.

Though Brown and Levinson proposed their model as universally applicable, their theory has been challenged by other scholars both theoretically and with respect to its cross-cultural applicability.

== Positive and negative face ==
The concept of face was derived from Chinese into English in the 19th century. "Face" conceptualized as an individual's positive claim of social values in socializing contact was introduced into academia by Erving Goffman through his theories of "face" and "facework". According to Brown and Levinson's assumption in politeness theory based on Goffman's "face", one's face is categorized into two forms: positive and negative. Brown and Levinson defined positive face two ways: as "the want of every member that his wants be desirable to at least some others executors" (p. 62), or alternatively, "the positive consistent self-image or 'personality' (crucially including the desire that this self-image be appreciated and approved of) claimed by interactants" (p. 61). Negative face was defined as "the want of every 'competent adult member' that his actions be unimpeded by others", or "the basic claim to territories, personal preserves, rights to non-distraction—i.e. the freedom of action and freedom from imposition". Whereas positive face involves a desire for connection with others, negative face needs include autonomy and independence.

Ten years later, Brown characterized positive face by desires to be liked, admired, ratified, and related to positively, noting that one would threaten positive face by ignoring someone. At the same time, she characterized negative face by the desire not to be imposed upon, noting that negative face could be impinged upon by imposing on someone. Positive face refers to one's self-esteem, while negative face refers to one's freedom to act. These two aspects of face are the basic wants in any social interaction; during any social interaction, cooperation is needed amongst the participants to maintain each other's face. Participants can do this by using positive politeness and negative politeness, which pay attention to people's positive and negative face needs respectively.

== Face-threatening acts ==
According to Brown and Levinson, positive and negative face exist universally in human culture; it has been argued that the notion of face is the actual universal component to their proposed politeness theory. A face threatening act is an act that inherently damages the face of the addressee or the speaker by acting in opposition to the wants and desires of the other. Face threatening acts can be verbal (using words/language), paraverbal (conveyed in the characteristics of speech such as tone, inflection, etc.), or non-verbal (facial expression, etc.). Based on the terms of conversation in social interactions, face-threatening acts are at times inevitable. At minimum, there must be at least one of the face threatening acts associated with an utterance. It is also possible to have multiple acts working within a single utterance.

=== Negative face-threatening acts ===
Negative face is threatened when an individual does not avoid or intend to avoid the obstruction of their interlocutor's freedom of action. It can cause damage to either the speaker or the hearer, and makes one of the interlocutors submit their will to the other. Freedom of choice and action are impeded when negative face is threatened.

==== Damage to the hearer ====
The following are cases in which the negative face of the hearer (the person being spoken to) is threatened.
- An act that affirms or denies a future act of the hearer creates pressure on the hearer to either perform or not perform the act.

Examples: orders, requests, suggestions, advice, remindings, threats, or warnings.

- An act that expresses the speaker's sentiments of the hearer or the hearer's belongings.

Examples: compliments, expressions of envy or admiration, or expressions of strong negative emotion toward the hearer (e.g. hatred, anger, distrust).

- An act that expresses speaker's future imposing of positive effects toward the hearer, as either rejection or acceptance put pressure on the hearer and may incur a debt.

Examples: offers and promises.

==== Damage to the speaker ====
The following are cases in which the negative face of the speaker (the person talking) is threatened.
- An act that speaker's humbles his own face or accept debt to maintain hearer's face and make good for the hearer.

Examples: expressing thanks, acceptance of gratitude or apology, excuse, acceptance of offers, pretending unaware of H's mistakes, committing to something unfavorable.

=== Positive face-threatening acts ===
Positive face is threatened when the speaker or hearer does not care about their interactor's feelings, wants, or does not want what the other wants. Positive face threatening acts can also cause damage to the speaker or the hearer. When an individual is forced to be separated from others so that their well-being is treated less importantly, positive face is threatened.

==== Damage to the hearer ====
The following are cases in which the positive face of the hearer (the person being spoken to) is threatened.
- An act that expresses the speaker's negative assessment of the hearer's positive face or an element of his/her positive face.

- The speaker directly or indirectly indicating that he dislikes some aspect of the hearer's possessions, desires, or personal attributes.

Examples: disapproval, criticism, contempt or ridicule, complaints and reprimands, accusations, insults.

- The speaker expresses disapproval by stating or implying that the hearer is wrong, irrational, or misguided.

Examples: contradictions or disagreements, challenges.

- An act that expresses the speaker's indifference toward the addressee's positive face.

- The addressee might be embarrassed for or fear the speaker.

Examples: excessively emotional expressions.

- The speaker indicates that he does not have the same values or fears as the hearer

Examples: disrespect, mention of topics which are inappropriate in general or in the context.

- The speaker indicates that he is willing to disregard the emotional well-being of the hearer.

Examples: belittling or boasting.

- The speaker increases the possibility that a face-threatening act will occur. This situation is created when a topic is brought up by the speaker that is a sensitive societal subject.

Examples: topics that relate to politics, race, religion.

- The speaker indicates that he is indifferent to the positive face wants of the hearer. This is most often expressed in obvious non-cooperative behavior.

Examples: interrupting, non sequiturs, abrupt change of subject.

- The speaker misidentifies the hearer in an offensive or embarrassing way. This may occur either accidentally or intentionally. Generally, this refers to the misuse of address terms in relation to status, gender, or age.

Example: Addressing a young woman as "ma'am" instead of "miss."

==== Damage to the speaker ====
The following are cases in which the positive face of the speaker (the person talking) is threatened.
- An act that shows that the speaker is in some sense wrong, has own dignity offended, or unable to control himself.

Examples: apologies, acceptance of compliment, inability to control one's physical self, inability to control one's emotional self, self-humiliation, confessions.

=== Refusals as threatening both positive and negative face ===
In their study of refusals to requests, Johnson et al. argue refusals can threaten both the positive and negative face of the refuser (the person who was asked a favor), and the positive face of the requester (the person asking for a favor). Obstacles, or reasons for non-compliance with a person's request, can "vary on three dimensions: willingness-unwillingness, ability-inability, and focus on-focus away from the requester".

The willingness dimension differentiates between refusals where the refuser states, "I don't want to help you" and "I'd like to help." Ability differentiates between, "I'm short on cash" and "I have some extra money." Focus on-focus away from requester differentiates between, "It's your problem, so you take care of it" and "It's terrible that your mom won't give you the money."

When a person makes a request, their positive face is threatened mostly along the ability and unwillingness dimensions. People tend to make requests of "intimates," people they are supposed to know well/have a good relationship with. Threat to the requester's positive face increases when the requester chooses a person who has low ability/inability to fulfill the request or is unwilling to comply (the person being asked has to refuse the request); choosing a person with low ability suggests the requester has poor relational knowledge. On the other hand, choosing a person with high ability decreases threat to the requester's positive face because it shows the requester's competence; choosing a person with high willingness reinforces the requester's choice and decreases threats to positive face.

Choosing to refuse or not refuse a request can threaten the requester's positive and negative faces in different ways. When a person refuses to comply with a request from an intimate, they are violating relational expectations and increasing threat to their positive face; however, focusing attention away from the requester can decrease threat to the requester's positive face even if they are unwilling to help. In contrast, focusing attention on the requester can increase threat to positive face since it highlights the refuser's unwillingness. Accepting a request is the least threatening act.

Threats to the refuser's negative face vary along the ability and focus dimensions. Focusing away from the requester allows the refuser to maintain their autonomy while maintaining the relationship; this leads to less face-threat if the refuser has high ability because they can choose whether to comply or not. Focusing on the requester would threaten their relationship with the requester and their long-term autonomy (the requester may be unwilling to comply to future requests when the roles are reversed); however, if the refuser has low ability, focusing on the requester can actually decrease threats to negative face by showing they are unable to comply even if they wanted to.

*Note: the requester and refuser would be analogous to the "speaker" and "hearer" roles discussed earlier in the section "Face-threatening acts".

== Politeness strategies ==
Politeness strategies are used to formulate messages in order to save the hearer's positive and negative face when face-threatening acts are inevitable or desired. Brown and Levinson outline four main types of politeness strategies: bald on-record, negative politeness, positive politeness, and off-record (indirect) as well as simply not using the face-threatening act. Jonathan Culpeper also used these strategies and added on them in his impolitness theory. Several factors contribute to the differences in the use of (im)politeness strategies, including work experience, writing skills, and familiarity with appropriate levels of formality.

=== Bald on-record ===
Bald on-record strategy does not attempt to minimize the threat to the hearer's face, although there are ways that bald on-record politeness can be used in trying to minimize face-threatening acts implicitly, such as giving advice in a non-manipulative way. Often using such a strategy will shock or embarrass the addressee, and so this strategy is most often utilized in situations where the speaker has a close relationship with the listener, such as family or close friends. Brown and Levinson outline various cases in which one might use the bald on-record strategy, including:

==== Situations and examples ====
- Situations with no threat minimization

- Urgency or desperation

Watch out!

- When efficiency is necessary

Hear me out:...

- Task-oriented

Pass me the hammer.

- Little or no desire to maintain someone's face

Don't forget to clean the blinds!

- Doing the face-threatening act is in the interest of the hearer

Your headlights are on!

- Situations where the threat is minimized implicitly

- Welcomes

Come in.

- Offers

Leave it, I'll clean up later.
Eat!

=== Positive politeness ===
Positive politeness strategies seek to minimize the threat to the hearer's positive face. These strategies are used to make the hearer feel good about themselves, their interests or possessions, and are most usually used in situations where the audience knows each other fairly well, or an individual's positive face needs, or self-worth, have to be met. In addition to hedging and attempts to avoid conflict, some strategies of positive politeness include statements of friendship, solidarity, compliments, and the following examples from Brown and Levinson:

==== Situations and examples ====
- Attend to H's interests, needs, wants

You look sad. Can I help you?

- Use solidarity in-group identity markers

Hey, mate, could you lend me 3 dollars?

- Be optimistic

Don't worry. You'll do just fine!

- Include both speaker (S) and hearer (H) in activity

You and I are going swimming together!

- Make offers or promises

If you wash the dishes, then I'll vacuum the floor.

- Exaggerate interest in H and his interests

That's a nice haircut. Where'd you get it?

- Avoid disagreement

Yeah, it's rather long; it only looks short from a distance.

- Make jokes

Your hair's even longer than my uncle's!

==== Other purposes and usages ====
Positive politeness strategies can also emerge in situations where the speakers do not know each other well. For example, Charlotte Rees and Lynn Knight have explored the role politeness theory plays in general practice consultations. They found that, in an effort to remain polite, patients agreed to the presence of a student observer during a general practice consultation even when the patient preferred a private consultation. Rees and Knight concluded that politeness strategies in the medical field can inhibit patients from providing complete and accurate information.

Another use of positive politeness is polite or formal speech such as Japanese honorifics. Again, this type of formal speech can be used to protect the hearer's positive face.

=== Negative politeness ===
Negative politeness strategies are oriented towards the hearer's negative face and emphasize avoidance of imposition on the hearer. By attempting to avoid imposition from the speaker, the risk of face-threat to the hearer is reduced. These strategies presume that the speaker will be imposing on the listener and there is a higher potential for awkwardness or embarrassment than in bald on record strategies and positive politeness strategies. Examples from Brown and Levinson include:

==== Situations and examples ====
- Be indirect

Would you know where Oxford Street is?

- Use hedges or questions

Perhaps, he might have taken it, maybe.
Could you please pass the rice?

- Be pessimistic

You couldn't find your way to lending me a thousand dollars, could you?
So I suppose some help is out of the question, then?

- Minimize the imposition

It's not too much out of your way, just a couple of blocks.

- Use obviating structures, like nominalizations, passives, or statements of general rules

I hope offense will not be taken.
Visitors sign the ledger.
Spitting will not be tolerated.

- Apologetic

I'm sorry; it's a lot to ask, but can you lend me a thousand dollars?

- Use plural pronouns (we, us)

We regret to inform you.

==== Three main stages of favor-seeking ====
Favor-seeking, or a speaker asking the hearer for a favor, is a common example of negative politeness strategies in use. Held observes three main stages in favor-seeking: the preparatory phase, the focal phase, and the final phase:

1. The preparatory phase is when the favor-seeking is preceded by elaborate precautions against loss of face to both sides. It often involves signals of openings and markers to be used to clarify the situation (e.g. 'You see,' or 'so,'). The request is often softened, made less direct, and imposing (e.g. past continuous 'I was wondering'; informal tag 'What d'you reckon?). The speaker must also reduce his own self-importance in the matter and exaggerate the hearer's (down-scaling compliments).
2. The focal stage is subdivided into elements such as asker's reasons or constraints (e.g. 'I've tried everywhere but can't get one'), the other's face (e.g. 'You're the only person I can turn to'), and more.
3. The third stage is the final stage which consists of anticipatory thanks, promises, and compliments (e.g. 'I knew you would say yes. You're an angel.').

McCarthy and Carter provide an example of negative politeness using the following dialogue from the Australian television soap opera Neighbours:

Clarrie: So I said to him, forget your books for one night, throw a party next weekend.
Helen: A party at number 30! What will Dorothy say about that?
Clarrie: Well, what she doesn't know won't hurt her. Of course, I'll be keeping my eye on things, and (SIGNAL OF OPENING) that brings me to my next problem. (EXPLAIN PROBLEM) You see, these young people, they don't want an old codger like me poking my nose in, so I'll make myself scarce, but I still need to be closer to hand, you see. So, (ASK FAVOR) I was wondering, would it be all right if I came over here on the night? What d'you reckon?
Helen: Oh, Clarrie, I...
Clarrie: Oh (MINIMIZATION) I'd be no bother. (REINFORCE EXPLANATION) It'd mean a heck of a lot to those kids.
Helen: All right.
Clarrie: (THANK WITH BOOST) I knew you'd say yes. You're an angel, Helen.
Helen: Ha! (laughs)

All of this is done in attempt to avoid imposition on the hearer. Negative politeness is concerned with proceeding towards a goal in the smoothest way and with sensitivity to one's interlocutors. In English, deference ('Excuse me, sir, could you please close the window') is associated with the avoidance or downplaying of an imposition; the more one feels they might be imposing, the more deferential one might be. It is clearly a strategy for negative politeness and the redressing of a threat to negative face, through actions such as favor-seeking.

=== Off-record (indirect) ===
The final politeness strategy outlined by Brown and Levinson is the indirect strategy; This strategy uses indirect language and removes the speaker from the potential to be imposing. The strategy of doing off-record is to express something general or different than the speaker's true meaning and relies on the hearer's interpretation to have the speaker's purpose get conveyed. The speaker can get credit for not imposing on the hearer or give the hearer a chance to be helpful and generous. This strategy relies heavily on pragmatics to convey the intended meaning while still utilizing the semantic meaning as a way to avoid losing face (see below in Choice of strategy).

==== Situations and examples ====
- · Minimizing the threat towards the hearer's freedom (S-Speaker, H-Hearer)

-S: Do you have a free chair over there? -H: Yes, I do. (grab the chair for the speaker)
-S: Are you going out? -H: Yes, but I'll come home early.

- Giving the hearer a chance to show good personality in caring for others

-S: My head aches a lot. -H: Oh, I'll get some pain-killer pills for you.

== Choice of strategy ==
Paul Grice argues that all conversationalists are rational beings who are primarily interested in the efficient conveying of messages. Brown and Levinson use this argument in their politeness theory by saying that rational agents will choose the same politeness strategy as any other would under the same circumstances to try to mitigate face. They show the available range of verbal politeness strategies to redress loss of face. Face-threatening acts have the ability to mutually threaten face, therefore rational agents seek to avoid face-threatening acts or will try to use certain strategies to minimize the threat. In certain situations, an over application of any particular strategy may actually achieve the opposite of the intended effect, as "certain speakers consistently evaluate polite behavior as unnecessary and offensive."

Speaker (S) will weigh:

1. the want to communicate the content of the face-threatening act in question
2. the want to be efficient or urgent
3. the want to maintain H's face to any degree

In most cooperative circumstances where 3. is greater than 2., S will want to minimize the face-threatening act.

=== Payoffs associated with each strategy ===
In deciding which strategy to use, the speaker runs through the individual payoffs of each strategy.

- Bald on-record

- enlists public pressure, puts H in the public eye if there are others present
- S gets credit for honesty, outspokenness which avoids the danger of seeming manipulative, yet can come across as abrasive and tactless
- S avoids danger of being misunderstood by putting intended meaning directly into utterance without the reliance upon the pragmatic meaning

- Positive politeness

- minimizes threatening aspect by assuring that S considers to be of the same kind with H, increasing the sense of solidarity and decreasing their social distance

- criticism may lose much of its sting if done in a way that asserts mutual friendship

- when S includes themself equally as a participant in the request or offer, it may lessen the potential for face-threatening act debt

- Ex: a person says "Let's get on with dinner" to their spouse in front of the television: by using the first person plural of the imperative form of the verb, the speaker is able to include themself as a recipient of the order, just like the hearer, likewise increasing solidarity.

- Negative politeness

- Helps avoid future debt by keeping social distance and not getting too familiar with H
- pays respect or deference by assuming that one may be intruding on the hearer in return for the face-threatening act.

- Ex: "I don't mean to bother you, but can I ask a quick question?"

- Off-record

- get credit for being tactful, non-coercive
- avoid responsibility for the potentially face-damaging interpretation
- give the addressee an opportunity to seem to care for S because it tests H's feelings towards S

- If S wants H to close the window, he may say "It's cold in here." If H answers "I'll go close the window" then he is responding to this potentially threatening act by giving a "gift" to the original speaker and therefore S avoids the potential threat of ordering H around and H gets credit for being generous or cooperative

- Do not do the face-threatening act.

- S avoids offending H at all
- S also fails to achieve his desired communication
- An example might be a physician avoiding bringing up the need for a patient to lose weight.

=== Sociological variables ===
Three sociological factors affect the choice of politeness strategy and the seriousness of the face threatening action: distance between speaker and listener; the power difference between the speaker and listener; and ranking of the seriousness of the face threat.

1. Social distance between parties (symmetric relation)
  Distinguishes kin or friend from a stranger with whom one may have the same social status, but who is still separate because of social distance. Different acts may be seen as face-threatening or non-face threatening depending on the social distance between speaker and listener
  Example: People may use less elaborate positive strategies or they may choose to use positive rather than negative politeness when speaking with family rather than a stranger
2. Power relations between parties (asymmetric relation)
  We are inclined to speak to our social equals differently than those whose status is higher or lower than our own in a given situation.
  Example: If a professor is working in her office and people are being very loud and disruptive in the next room, she will go over there and tell them to be quiet but the way she does it will differ depending on who it is. If they are students she will use the bald on-record strategy to make sure there is no confusion in what she is asking, saying: "Stop talking so loud!".
  But if they are colleagues she will claim common ground with them using the positive politeness strategy or frame an indirect request for them to stop talking, saying: "I'm working on a lecture and it's really hard to concentrate with all this noise."
  Additionally if they are really high status directors of the department she may end up saying nothing at all or apologize for interrupting them, refraining from the face-threatening act.
3. The absolute ranking of the threat of the face-threatening act
  Some impositions are considered more serious than others. Highly imposing acts like requests demand more redress to mitigate their increased threat level.

Overall the formula for the weight of a face-threatening act is:

Weight = Social distance (speaker, hearer) + power difference (speaker, hearer) + rank of imposition

=== Hierarchy of strategies ===
The greater potential for loss of face requires greater redressive action. If the potential for loss of face is too great, the speaker may make the decision to abandon the face-threatening acts completely and say nothing.

The number next to each strategy corresponds to the danger-level of the particular face-threatening act. The more dangerous the particular face-threatening act is, the more S will tend to use a higher numbered strategy.

1. No redressive action
  *Bald On-Record- leaves no way for H to minimize the face-threatening act.
2. Positive redressive action
  *S satisfies a wide range of H's desires not necessarily related to the face-threatening act.
  **Shows interest in H
  **Claims common ground with H
  **Seeks agreement
  **Gives sympathy
3. Negative redressive action
  *S satisfies H's desires to be unimpeded—the want that is directly challenged by the face-threatening act.
  **Be conventionally indirect
  **Minimize imposition on H
  **Beg forgiveness
  **Give deference
  *This implies that the matter is important enough for S to disturb H
4. Off-record
  *S has the opportunity to evade responsibility by claiming that H's interpretation of the utterance as a face-threatening act is wrong
5. Do not do the face-threatening act.

== Application examples ==
Although the politeness theory originated from the curiosity of linguistics and language forming, scholars are beginning to see its other benefits: its ability to not only help with interpersonal relationships, workplace environments, and beyond.

=== Business world ===
One study by Cynthia Dunn observed a Japanese business that required etiquette training for their new employees. Employees were taught the company's definition of politeness; they were expected to incorporate these beliefs into their day-to-day behavior, such as "kindness," "consideration for others," and "deference and respect". However, self-presentation was also a critical feature employers wanted their employees to improve upon. An attractive self-presentation through various nonverbals and word choice would not only reflect the individual's politeness but the corporation's as well. This decision had very positive consequences in the workplace environment.

New studies introduce the possibility that politeness theory may be applied in further areas. For example, more businesses may begin to take on these concepts and incorporate them into their discussion and conflict-resolution strategies. This could be effective in achieving long-term goals.

=== Art world ===
In his 1967 work Interaction Ritual: Essays on Face-to-Face Behavior, Goffman posits numerous times that with every remark people make, they risk maintaining their face and the face of others. Politeness theory is generally applied when assessing speech acts or remarks. However, a study conducted by Jurgita Sribaitė looked at politeness theory as it applied to written art reviews. The study focused on art reviews in Lithuania in the early and mid-1970s and analyzed the different strategies used by the art reviewers as they attempted to critique pieces of art while maintaining their face as well as the face of the artists. The study was able to identify face-saving acts and all four politeness strategies at work. The author states, "Reviewers usually appear to have in mind the addressee's positive face (the desire to be liked and be approved of) as well as his negative face (the desire to be left free to act as he chooses)." The examples given show that even the reviewers, who hold the obvious advantage over the addressees, cared to save both their face and the face of the artists.

=== Humor ===
Positive politeness strategies are used as a way of giving someone a sense of belonging and as seen in the politeness strategies section, jokes are considered a positive politeness strategy. Therefore, joking can be a way of making someone feel as though they belong. However, some contemporary researchers have noted that humor is complex and not all jokes can be considered polite. In fact, many instances of humor usage can negatively affect face for a number of reasons: the hearer's ability to understand the joke is tested, the hearer may interpret verification of the willingness to hear a joke as aggressive, and the hearer can be threatened even by non-aggressive humor if it tests their ability to understand the joke or their emotions. In a study conducted by Marta Dynel in 2016, different occasions of humor used in the television show House were assessed and analyzed as polite or impolite. In reference to the conclusions of study Dynel states, "Specifically, humor may serve politeness and/or impoliteness depending on the speaker's intention and awareness of the consequences his/her utterance may carry, the hearer's recognition of the speaker's intention, as well as his/her ultimate amusement or taking offense." In general, humor can provide face-saving tactics that enable solidarity, but it can also be a risky strategy because the speaker and the hearer must be on the same page.

=== Delivering bad news ===
When delivering bad news the speaker has a lot to consider regarding his or her own face and the face of the hearer. In 2015, Miroslav Sirota and Marie Juanchich conducted a study on uncertainty communication with negative outcomes. The authors suggest "First, speakers making a prediction may intend not only to inform about a probability level, but also to manage the hearer's faces or their own...Second, speakers perform face-managing intentions by altering (e.g. lessening or magnifying) the explicitly communicated probablility of a negative outcome...Thus, politeness theory posits that speakers use uncertainty quantifiers to pursue informative intentions and also to sugar-coat threatening news to manage the hearers' or their own faces."

The study conducted required people to communicate bad news to a friend regarding two scenarios. In the first scenario the subjects had to communicate a 50% probability that their friend's new car was going to break-down, and in the second scenario the subjects communicated a 50% chance that their friend's stock were going to lose their value. The subjects of the study reported that "speakers intended to manage hearer's faces from threatening news or to manage their own faces from being wrong... speakers communicated an altered (in the case of our scenarios, lower) outcome probability when they intended to be tactful or cautious than when they intended to be informative."

In 2002, an oncologist by the name of Jerome Groopman wrote an article entitled, Dying Words; How should doctors deliver bad news?. In his article he recalls one of the first experiences in which he had to tell a young woman that she has malignant terminal cancer. He said to her, "Claire, with this disease, a remission would ordinarily last three to six months. A person could expect to survive between one and two years." He found that this type of strategy (bald on-record) deeply shook the patient (negatively threatened her negative face). He now uses different strategies and realized that with sensitive information tact must be used, but also that the patient must be aware of the true probability of negative outcome. Many doctors, he argues, do not find that balance and tend to hedge information, "More than forty percent of oncologists withhold a prognosis from a patient if he or she does not ask for it or if the family requests that the patient not be told. A similar number speak in euphemisms, skirting the truth." This statement reads similarly to the Sirota and Juanchich study; bad news is very frequently sugar-coated in attempt to save face.

=== Mitigated speech ===
In his book Outliers, Canadian journalist Malcolm Gladwell wrote a chapter entitled "The Ethnic Theory of Plane Crashes." The chapter attempts to explain why so many planes that crash end up crashing due to human error, not mechanical issues. One of the most prominent reasons, Gladwell points out, is the lack of effective communication due to the power dynamic between the captain and the first officer. He uses numerous examples of black box recordings in which the first officer hints at a problem instead of addressing it outright. He introduces the linguistic term mitigated speech and states, "We mitigate when we're being polite, or when we're ashamed or embarrassed, or when we're being deferential to authority." First officers tend to use mitigated speech when addressing their captain and this has caused plane crashes in the past.

Linguists Ute Fischer and Judith Orasanu conducted a study with a group of captains and first officers. They gave them a scenario in which they had to communicate to each other the need to change course to avoid a thunderstorm. Overwhelmingly the captains used commands, or what Brown and Levinson would consider bald on-record politeness strategy, to communicate with their first officer. On the other hand, the first officers only used hints, similar to what politeness theory would consider an off-record politeness strategy, to communicate with their superior, the captain. Airlines have been taking this issue seriously and have made strides in teaching captains and first officers how to communicate with each other effectively.

=== Intercultural communication ===
Various researchers have analyzed the application of politeness theory in communication between different cultural groups. Communicative expectations, patterns of communicative activities and choice of politeness strategies vary among cultures. For instance, Morisaki and Gudykunst argue that members from individualist cultures prefer to use negative politeness strategies in conflict management, while members from collectivist cultures would rather use positive politeness strategies.

In addition, some other researchers focused on the acquaintance of politeness strategies and knowledge about politeness difference in foreign language education. Japanese researcher Kawai found that there is a lack of "cultural learning" in English education that makes the Japanese student weak in effectively using politeness strategies in English, such as the reliance on context understanding in Japanese may cause face-threatening acts when in inter-cultural communication with western cultures. Tanaka and Kawade found differences in the usage pattern of politeness strategies among native English speakers and ESL learners.

== Critiques ==
Brown and Levinson's politeness theory is very applicable not only in the area of study within the communication field but also helpful in guiding individuals in ways to improve their speech and actions Two qualities in particular stand out:

1. Good heuristic value: This theory has motivated scholars to implement more research into grasping these ideas or finding alternatives to this way of thinking.
2. Broad scope: This theory considers factors that play a role in the field of communication such as "language, identity, relational definition ... social power, distance, and culture".

On the other hand, Although Brown and Levinson's theory is widely applicable, some weaknesses in their theory have been noted.

=== Cultural differences ===
Many academics have critiqued that many cultures use politeness strategies differently than how Brown and Levinson theorized. Many sociologists criticize that politeness theory is heavily based on Western cultures where individualism is highly valued compared to many non-Western cultures where group identity is valued over the individual. Some of this intracultural difference is, in part, due to diverse "knowledge and values" within a particular society, but Brown and Levinson argue that their theory is universal.

Although everyone has face wants, there are different ways strategies they use to accomplish these wants or mitigate face threats based on their culture. For example, negative politeness is the norm in some cultures (Japan and Britain) but not others that prefer positive politeness (Australia) and some cultures use politeness strategies when there is no face threat, such as the Japanese honorific system. Ide et al. shows that the roughly equivalent term in Japanese, teneina, has different sets of connotations associated with it from the English term politeness. Gu (1998) pointed out that some face concerns in Western culture are not taken into account in Eastern cultures. In a series of interviews conducted by Blum-Kulka, House and Kasper in 1989 of fifty-two Israeli families, they conclude that as suggested already by the semantic definitions offered for the term politeness by Israelis, the constituents of "tact" and its appropriate modes of expression are very much subject to cultural interpretation.

=== Inclusiveness of politeness strategies ===
Some claim that a few of these techniques may be used in more than one type of situation or more than one at a time. Additionally, a given speech act (of any politeness strategy) can have multiple consequences, rather than affecting only positive face or negative face as the current theory suggests.

=== Nonverbal aspects of communication ===
Sometimes nonverbal actions speak louder than verbal communication and might alter how the politeness strategy is interpreted or which politeness strategy is used.

=== Individual differences ===
An individual may have a pattern or way of communicating that they have habitually used in the past that others may consider face threatening or vice versa. Mood may also drive how they choose to respond to a situation regardless of politeness strategies.

=== Issues with terminology and their definitions ===
Various definitions of 'politeness' which make reference to considering others' feelings, establishing levels of mutual comfort, and promoting rapport have been found to be lacking, in that often whether a verbal act is face threatening or not depends upon preemptively knowing how the hearer will interpret it. This view shifts the focus from predominantly upon the speaker to upon both speaker and hearer, implying that politeness is socially constructed and therefore not universal, requiring cross-cultural examination. Additionally, a distinction has been made between first- and second-order politeness, due to the appropriation of an English word for a scientific concept: first-order politeness "correspond[s] to the various ways in which polite behavior is perceived and talked about by members of socio-cultural groups", meaning the connotation of 'politeness' for those not studying it, and second-order politeness is "a theoretical construct, a term within a theory of social behavior and language usage", meaning the scientific application of the term.

Spencer-Oatey argues that sociality rights also plays a role in relationship management other than "face", and Brown and Levinson's "negative face" is not about face concerns but should be conceptualized into sociality rights. Watts (2003) argues that "it is impossible to evaluate (im) politeness behaviour out of the context of real, ongoing verbal interaction" and also "social interaction is negotiated on-line."

=== Hierarchy politeness ===
Scholars suggest power differences vary between strangers and acquaintances, which in turn, shape the effects of the politeness strategies. Social similarity and intimacy are other aspects to consider, as these connections create an increased awareness of the other person's meaning and request and therefore minimize the face-threatening act. In 1964, socio-psychologist Edward E. Jones wrote a book on ingratiation and defines it as "a class of strategic behaviors illicitly designed to influence a particular other person concerning the attractiveness of one's personal qualities." The concept of ingratiation has helped spur further investigation into how its power dynamics play into Brown and Levinson's politeness theory. The claim has been made that Brown and Levinson's theory does not take into account the effect unique dynamic power relations and rankings has on the way people interact with one another (i.e. ingratiation).

An article written by Akio Yabuuchi argues a case for a new trichotomous politeness system to replace politeness theory's dichotomous politeness system; hierarchy politeness The proposed system is made up of fellowship politeness (similar to Brown and Levinson's positive politeness), autonomy politeness (similar to Brown and Levinson's negative politeness), and hierarchy politeness. Hierarchy politeness recognizes ingratiation as a way to communicate within power dynamics.

== See also ==
- Complimentary language and gender
- Cooperative principle
- Politeness maxims
