= Politeness maxims =

Suggested principles of politeness

According to Geoffrey Leech, there is a politeness principle with conversational maxims similar to those formulated by Paul Grice. He lists six maxims: tact, generosity, approbation, modesty, agreement, and sympathy. The first and second form a pair, as do the third and the fourth. These maxims vary from culture to culture: what may be considered polite in one culture may be strange or downright rude in another.

== The tact maxim ==
The tact maxim states: "Minimize the expression of beliefs which imply cost to other; maximize the expression of beliefs which imply benefit to other." The first part of this maxim fits in with Brown and Levinson's negative politeness strategy of minimising the imposition, and the second part reflects the positive politeness strategy of attending to the hearer's interests, wants, and needs. For example:

- Could I interrupt you for a second?
- If I could just clarify this then.

== The generosity maxim ==
Leech's generosity maxim states: "Minimize the expression of beliefs that express or imply benefit to self; maximize the expression of beliefs that express or imply cost to self." Unlike the tact maxim, the maxim of generosity focuses on the speaker, and says that others should be put first instead of the self. For example:

- You relax and let me do the dishes.
- You must come and have dinner with us.

== The approbation maxim ==
The approbation maxim states: "Minimize the expression of beliefs which express dispraise of other; maximize the expression of beliefs which express approval of other." It is preferred to praise others and if this is impossible, to sidestep the issue, to give some sort of minimal response (possibly through the use of euphemisms), or to remain silent. The first part of the maxim avoids disagreement; the second part intends to make other people feel good by showing solidarity. For example:

- I heard you singing at the karaoke last night. It sounded like you were enjoying yourself!
- Gideon, I know you're a genius – would you know how to solve this math problem here?

== The modesty maxim ==
The maxim of modesty is one of the six maxims proposed by Leech (1983) in his PP (politeness principle) meaning to minimize praise or to maximize dispraise of self. The modesty maxim states: "Minimize the expression of praise of self; maximize the expression of dispraise of self." For example:

- Oh, I'm so stupid – I didn't make a note of our lecture! Did you?

== The agreement maxim ==
The agreement maxim runs as follows: "Minimize the expression of disagreement between self and other; maximize the expression of agreement between self and other." It is in line with Brown and Levinson's positive politeness strategies of "seek agreement" and "avoid disagreement", to which they attach great importance. However, it is not being claimed that people totally avoid disagreement. It is simply observed that they are much more direct in expressing agreement, rather than disagreement. For example:

- A: I don't want my daughter to do this, I want her to do that.
- B: Yes, but ma'am, I thought we resolved this already on your last visit.

== The sympathy maxim ==
The sympathy maxim states: "minimize antipathy between self and other; maximize sympathy between the self and other." This includes a small group of speech acts such as congratulation, commiseration, and expressing condolences – all of which is in accordance with Brown and Levinson's positive politeness strategy of attending to the hearer's interests, wants, and needs. For example:

- I am sorry to hear about your father.

== See also ==
- Politeness theory
