= Tag question =

Sentence with a declarative or imperative clause followed by an interrogative element

A tag question is a construction in which an interrogative element is added to a declarative or an imperative clause. The resulting speech act comprises an assertion paired with a request for confirmation. For instance, the English tag question "You're John, aren't you?" consists of the declarative clause "You're John" and the interrogative tag "aren't you?"

== Uses ==
In most languages, tag questions are more common in spoken usage than in formal written usage. They can be an indicator of politeness, hedging, consensus seeking, emphasis and irony. They may suggest confidence or lack of confidence; they may be confrontational, defensive or tentative. Although they have the grammatical form of a question, they may be rhetorical (not expecting an answer). In other cases, when they do expect a response, they may differ from straightforward questions in that they cue the listener as to what response is desired. In legal settings, tag questions can often be found in a leading question. According to a specialist children's lawyer at the National Society for the Prevention of Cruelty to Children (NSPCC), children find it difficult to answer tag questions other than in accordance with the expectation of the questioner using or tagging a question.

== Forms ==
Question tags are formed in several ways, and many languages give a choice of formation. In some languages the most common is a single word or fixed phrase, whereas in others it is formed by a regular grammatical construction.

=== Single word forms ===
In many languages, the question tag is a simple positive or negative. Russian allows да? (yes) whereas Spanish and Italian use ¿no? and no? respectively. In Indonesian, sometimes ya? (yes) is used but it is more common to say kan?, which probably is a contraction of bukan (negation for nouns).

Another common formation is comparable to the English correct? or the informal form right?, though more often realised as the word for true or truth, in fact, such as in Polish prawda? or "co nie?", Slovak pravda? or the particle však?, or Spanish ¿verdad?, which in turn can be presented in a negative form (not true?), such as in the Russian не правда ли?, German nicht wahr? Lithuanian ar ne?, or Latin nonne?

A plain conjunction may be used, such as the Czech and Slovak že? (that). Various other words occur in specific languages, such as German oder? (or), Slovak či? (or, colloquialism), and the Mandarin Chinese 吗 ma (a question denominator, used as a modal particle to denote questions – untranslatable).

Another pattern is to combine affirmation and negation, as can be done in Chinese, for example as 對不對 duì bù duì (Correct or not?); or Vietnamese đúng không? (Correct, no?).

Some languages have words whose only function is as a question tag. In Scots and certain dialects of English, eh? functions this way. French has hein?, Southern German dialects have gell? (derived from a verb meaning to be valid) and Brazilian Portuguese has né? (actually a colloquial contraction of não é, literally isn't it, while é?, pronounced much like English eh?, would have a different intended meaning, that of English right?), Hungarian uses "ugye?".

=== Grammatically regular forms ===
In several languages, the tag question is built around the standard interrogative form. In English and the Celtic languages, this interrogative agrees with the verb in the main clause, whereas in other languages the structure has fossilised into a fixed form, such as the French n'est-ce pas ? (literally "isn't it?").

==== Grammatically productive tag forms ====
Grammatically productive tag forms are formed in the same way as simple questions, referring back to the verb in the main clause and agreeing in time and person (where the language has such agreement). The tag may include a pronoun, such as in English, or may not, as is the case in Scottish Gaelic. If the rules of forming interrogatives require it, the verb in the tag may be an auxiliary, as in English.

=== Punctuation ===
In most languages, a tag question is set off from the sentence by a comma ⟨,⟩. In Spanish, where the beginnings of questions are marked with an inverted question mark, it is only the tag, not the whole sentence, which is placed within the question bracket:

- Estás cansado, ¿verdad? (You're tired, aren't you?).

== In English ==
English tag questions, when they have the grammatical form of a question, are atypically complex, because they vary according to at least three factors: the choice of auxiliary, the negation and the intonation pattern. This is unique among the Germanic languages, but the Celtic languages operate in a very similar way. For the theory that English has borrowed its system of tag questions from Brittonic, see Brittonicisms in English.

=== Auxiliary ===
The English tag question is made up of an auxiliary verb and a pronoun. The auxiliary must agree with the tense, aspect and modality of the verb in the preceding sentence. If the verb is in the present perfect, for example, the tag question uses has or have; if the verb is in a present progressive form, the tag is formed with am, are, is; if the verb is in a tense which does not normally use an auxiliary, like the present simple, the auxiliary is taken from the emphatic do form; and if the sentence has a modal auxiliary, this is echoed in the tag:

- He has read this book, hasn't he?
- He read this book, didn't he?
- He's reading this book, isn't he?
- He reads a lot of books, doesn't he?
- He'll read this book, won't he?
- He should read this book, shouldn't he?
- He can read this book, can't he?
- He'd read this book, wouldn't he?
- He'd read this book, hadn't he?

A special case occurs when the main verb is to be in a simple tense. Here the tag question repeats the main verb, not an auxiliary:

- This is a book, isn't it?

=== Balanced and unbalanced tags ===
English question tags exist in both positive and negative forms. When there is no special emphasis, the rule of thumb often applies that a positive sentence has a negative tag and vice versa. This form may express confidence, or seek confirmation of the asker's opinion or belief.

- She is French, isn't she?
- She's not French, is she?

These are referred to as balanced tag questions.

Unbalanced tag questions feature a positive statement with a positive tag, or a negative statement with a negative tag; it has been estimated that in normal conversation, as many as 40–50% of tags are unbalanced. Unbalanced tag questions may be used for ironic or confrontational effects:

- Do listen, will you?
- Oh, I'm lazy, am I?
- Jack: I refuse to spend Sunday at your mother's house! Jill: Oh you do, do you? We'll see about that!
- Oh! Making a stand, are we?

Unbalanced tags are also used for guessing, or for a suggestion with let's and shall. In particular, let's is always used with the positive unbalanced form:

- You have talked him into this, have you?
- I'll make tea, shall I?
- Let's start, shall we?

Patterns of negation can show regional variations. In North East Scotland, for example, positive to positive is used when no special effect is desired:

- This pizza's fine, is it? (standard English: This pizza's delicious, isn't it?)

Note the following variations in the negation when the auxiliary is the I form of the copula:

- Standard/formal: Clever, am I not?
- England (and America, Australia, etc.): Clever, aren't I?
- Scotland/Northern Ireland: Clever, amn't I?
- nonstandard dialects: Clever, ain't I?

=== Intonation ===
English tag questions can have a rising or a falling intonation pattern. This can be contrasted with Polish, French or German, for example, where all tags rise, or with the Celtic languages, where all fall. As a rule, the English rising pattern is used when soliciting information or motivating an action, that is, when some sort of response is required. Since normal English yes/no questions have rising patterns (e.g. Are you coming?), these tags make a grammatical statement into a real question:

- You're coming, aren't you?
- Do listen, will you?
- Let's have a beer, shall we?

The falling pattern is used to underline a statement. The statement itself ends with a falling pattern, and the tag sounds like an echo, strengthening the pattern. Most English tag questions have this falling pattern.

- He doesn't know what he's doing, does he?
- This is really boring, isn't it?

Sometimes the rising tag goes with the positive to positive pattern to create a confrontational effect:

- He was the best in the class, was he? (rising: the speaker is challenging this thesis, or perhaps expressing surprised interest)
- He was the best in the class, wasn't he? (falling: the speaker holds this opinion)
- Be careful, will you? (rising: expresses irritation)
- Take care, won't you? (falling: expresses concern)

Sometimes the same words may have different patterns depending on the situation or implication.

- You don't remember my name, do you? (rising: expresses surprise)
- You don't remember my name, do you? (falling: expresses amusement or resignation)
- Your name's Mary, isn't it? (rising: expresses uncertainty)
- Your name's Mary, isn't it? (falling: expresses confidence)

As an all-purpose tag the Multicultural London English set-phrase innit (for "isn't it") is only used with falling patterns:

- He doesn't know what he's doing, innit?
- He was the best in the class, innit?

On the other hand, the adverbial tag questions (all right? OK? etc.) are almost always found with rising patterns. An occasional exception is surely.

=== Other forms ===
Besides the standard form based on auxiliary verbs, there are other forms specific to particular regions or dialects of English. These are generally invariant, regardless of verb, person or negativity.

The tag right? is common in a number of dialects across the UK and US, as well as in Indian English. It is an example of an invariable tag which is preferred in American English over traditional tags.

The tags isn't it? and no? are used in Indian English.

The tag eh? is of Scottish origin, and can be heard across much of Scotland, New Zealand, Canada and the North-Eastern United States. In Central Scotland (in and around Stirling and Falkirk), this exists in the form eh no? which is again invariant.

The conjunction or? is also used to make yes/no-questions less imposing. These questions frequently formulate a candidate understanding and signal that the bias towards a confirming answer is weaker, while opening up for an elaboration to the answer. Examples:

- Does that bring up jealousy for you or?
- Is he in good spirits or?

The tag hey? (of Afrikaans and Dutch origin) is used in South African English.

== In Celtic languages ==
Like English, the Celtic languages form tag questions by echoing the verb of the main sentence. The Goidelic languages, however, make little or no use of auxiliary verbs, so that it is generally the main verb itself which reappears in the tag. As in English, the tendency is to have a negative tag after a positive sentence and vice versa, but unbalanced tags are also possible. Some examples from Scottish Gaelic:

(Here, eil and fhaca are dependent forms of the irregular verbs tha and chunnaic.)

- Is toil leat fìon, nach toil? – You like wine, don't you?
- Tha i brèagha an diugh, nach eil? – It's nice today, isn't it?
- Chunnaic mi e, nach fhaca? – I saw him, didn't I?
- Thèid mi ga dhùsgadh, an tèid? – I'll go and wake him, shall I? (unbalanced!)

In Welsh, a special particle on is used to introduce tag questions, which are then followed by the inflected form of a verb. Unlike English and the Goidelic languages, Welsh prefers a positive tag after a positive statement, and negative after negative. With the auxiliary bod, it is the inflected form of bod that is used:

- Mae hi'n bwrw glaw heddiw, on dydy? – It's raining today, isn't it?
- Dydy hi ddim yn bwrw glaw heddiw, on nac ydy? – It's not raining today, is it?

With inflected non-preterite forms, the inflected form of the verb is used:

- Doi di yfory, on doi? – You'll come tomorrow, won't you?

With preterite and perfect forms, the invariable do (also the affirmative answer to these questions) is used:

- Canodd y bobl, on do? – The people sang, didn't they?
- Mae hi wedi ei weld o, on do? – She's seen him, hasn't she?

When a non-verbal element is being questioned, the question particle ai is used:

- Mr Jones, on dai? – Mr Jones, isn't it? or Mr Jones, on tefe?

== In Esperanto ==
While its first usage is to be placed at first word of a sentence to turn it into a question, the particle ĉu can also be appended at the end of any assertion to render a tag question.

== In French ==
Question tags are not very common in French literature.

The structure n'est-ce pas ? (literally "isn't it?", more idiomatically glossed to English as "isn't it true?") is nowadays considered very formal or obsolete. Unlike in English, the question tag n'est-ce pas ? can be used after any subject and verb.

- French: Vous venez ce soir, n'est-ce pas ?
  - Literally: You are coming tonight, isn't it?
  - English: "You are coming tonight, aren't you?"
- French: Elle est en France, n'est-ce pas ?
  - Literally: She is in France, isn't it?
  - English: "She is in France, isn't she?"
- French: Tu n'es pas venu, n'est-ce pas ?
  - Literally: You didn't come, isn't it?
  - English: "You didn't come, did you?"

Colloquially it can be rendered through ou bien ? (literally "or well?", more idiomatically glossed to English as "or what?") as well as ou pas ? ("or not?").

A more common and formal question tag consists in putting a non? (no?) at the end of a positive sentence or a si? (yes? with a negative sentence) at the end of a negative sentence. This structure is also sometimes used by native French speakers with a basic level of English.

- French: Il y a des taxis, non ?
  - Literally: There are taxis, no?
  - English: "There are taxis, aren't there?"
- French: Je vais pas rater mon vol, si ?
  - Literally: I'm not going to miss my flight, yes?
  - English: "I'm not going to miss my flight, am I?"
