= Face (sociological concept) =

Class of behaviors and customs

In sociology, face refers to a class of behaviors and customs, associated with the morality, honor, and authority of an individual (or group of individuals), and their image within social groups. Face is linked to the dignity and prestige that a person enjoys in terms of their social relationships. This idea, with varying nuances, is observed in many societies and cultures, including Chinese, Arab, Indonesian, Korean, Malaysian, Laotian, Indian, Japanese, Vietnamese, Filipino, Thai, Persian, Russian, and other East Slavic cultures.

The usage of "face" in the English language is borrowed from Chinese. Face has particularly complex dynamics and meanings within the context of Chinese culture and is closely associated with Confucianism. The Chinese concept of face has also heavily influenced the cultures of Japan, Vietnam and Korea.

== Definitions ==
Although Chinese writer Lin Yutang claimed "face cannot be translated or defined", these definitions have been created:

- "Face is an image of self delineated in terms of approved social attributes."
- Face is the "respectability and/or deference which a person can claim for himself from others".
- Face is a quality that can be lost, maintained, or enhanced, and must be constantly attended to in interaction.
- Face is "a sense of worth that comes from knowing one's status and reflecting concern with the congruence between one's performance or appearance and one's real worth."
- "Face" means "sociodynamic valuation", a lexical hyponym of words meaning "prestige; dignity; honor; respect; status".

== By culture ==
=== Arab world ===
In Arabic, the expression hafiẓa māʼ al-wajh (حفظ ماء الوجه, lit. 'save the face's water', is used to mean save face. The entire Arab culture of social and family behavior is based around Islamic concepts of dignity. For Shia Islam, face is based on the social and family ranking system found in the Treatise of Rights, Al-Risalah al-Huquq, Shia Islam's primary source for social behaviors.

=== East Asia ===
==== Chinese ====
In China, in particular, the concepts of mianzi, lian and yan play an extremely important role in the fabric of society.

In Chinese culture, "face" refers to two distinct concepts, although linked in Chinese social relations. One is mianzi (面子), and the other is lian (臉), which are used regularly in everyday language although not so much in formal writing.

Two influential Chinese authors explained face. The Chinese writer Lu Xun referred to the American missionary Arthur Henderson Smith's interpretation.

The term "face" keeps cropping up in our conversation, and it seems such a simple expression that I doubt whether many people give it much thought. Recently, however, we have heard this word on the lips of foreigners too, who seem to be studying it. They find it extremely hard to understand, but believe that "face" is the key to the Chinese spirit and that grasping it will be like grabbing a queue twenty-four years ago [when wearing a queue was compulsory] – everything else will follow.

Lin Yutang considered the psychology of "face":

Interesting as the Chinese physiological face is, the psychological face makes a still more fascinating study. It is not a face that can be washed or shaved, but a face that can be "granted" and "lost" and "fought for" and "presented as a gift". Here we arrive at the most curious point of Chinese social psychology. Abstract and intangible, it is yet the most delicate standard by which Chinese social intercourse is regulated.

The concept of face has a significant role in Chinese diplomacy.

Miàn (面) "face; personal esteem; countenance; surface; side" occurs in words like:

- miànzi (面子) "face; side; reputation; self-respect; prestige, honor; social standing." It is similar to the concept of "keeping up with appearances".
- miànmù (面目; 'face and eyes') "face; appearance; respect; social standing; prestige; honor (only used in ancient Chinese prose. Now it only means appearance)"
- miànpí (面皮; 'face skin') "facial skin; complexion; feelings; sensitivity; sense of shame"
- tǐmiàn (體面; 'body face') "face; good looking; honor; dignity; prestige"
- qíngmian (情面; 'feelings face') "face; prestige; favor; kindness; partiality"

Hsien-chin Hu says “face”

can be borrowed, struggled for, added to, padded, — all terms indicating a gradual increase in volume. It is built up through initial high position, wealth, power, ability, through cleverly establishing social ties to a number of prominent people, as well as through avoidance of acts that would cause unfavorable comment.

Liǎn (臉) "face; countenance; respect; reputation; prestige" is seen in several face words:

- liǎnshàng (臉上; 'face on/above') "one's face; honor; respect"
- liǎnmiàn (臉面; 'face face') "face; self-respect; prestige; influence"
- liǎnpí (臉皮; 'face skin') "face; sensitivity; compassion"

Hu contrasts méiyǒu liǎn (沒有臉; 'without face') "audacious; wanton; shameless" as "the most severe condemnation that can be made of a person" and bùyào liǎn (不要臉; 'don't want face') "shameless; selfishly inconsiderate" as "a serious accusation meaning that ego does not care what society thinks of his character, that he is ready to obtain benefits for himself in defiance of moral standards".

Yán (顏) "face; prestige; reputation; honor" occurs in the common expression diū yán 丟顏 and the words:

- yánhòu (顏厚; 'face thick') or hòuyán 厚顏 "thick-skinned; brazen; shameless; impudent"
- yánmiàn (顏面; 'face face') "face; honor; prestige"

==== Japanese ====
In Japan, the concept of face is known as mentsu (面子), which is defined as “the public image people want to present within a given social framework”. More specifically, mentsu can only be established when in social situations where others are present. It is associated with the fulfillment of one's social role(s) as expected by others. There are two main types of face in Japanese culture:

- Menboku (面目) refers to “aspects of the self approved of or respectability given by others”. This encompasses the fulfillment of one's duty in social settings.
- Taimen (体面) refers to the projected self or ostentation, which involves “the duty to clear one’s reputation of insult or imputation of failure”.

The terms menboku and taimen were borrowed into Japanese from the Chinese miànmù and tǐmiàn during the Heian period, while mentsu, from miànzi, entered the language in the 1920s–1930s.

The need for positive self-regard is culturally variant and Japanese motivations for positive self-regard differ from those of other cultures in that it is primarily self-critically focused. From a young age, children are encouraged by parents to become socially shared images of the ideal person through the phrase “rashii” (らしい；similar to). In this way, social roles influence how Japanese identify themselves but also establish the desirable image Japanese people wish to present in front of others. “Japanese competition characterized by yokonarabi (横並び), emphasizing not on surpassing others, but on not falling behind others”. The continual effort to improve oneself as summarized by the saying gambarimasu (頑張ります) can be viewed as an expression to secure the esteem of others, illustrating high motivations to maintain public face in Japanese culture.

In contrast to the Chinese notion of mianzi which emphasizes one's power, the Japanese notion of mentsu places emphasis on social roles. A comparative study of Japanese and Chinese student's perceptions of face revealed that Japanese students tend to be more concerned about face in situations relating to social status and appropriate treatment of others based on social status, while Chinese students tend to be more concerned in situations concerning evaluations of competence or performance.

The integration of face in Japanese culture is evident in the language and cultural norms. According to Matsumoto 1988, “To attend to each other’s face in Japanese culture is to recognize each other’s social position and to convey such a recognition through the proper linguistic means, including formulaic expressions, honorifics, verbs of giving and receiving, and other “relation-acknowledging devices”. The Japanese cultural norms of honne (本音; inner feelings) and tatemae (建前; presented stance) , a commonly understood model of communication whereby individuals put up a polite “front” that hides their real beliefs, emphasize the importance placed on carrying out social responsibility in Japanese society.

In the politeness-orientated Japanese society, simple sentences in English would have many variations in Japanese where the speaker must make linguistic choices based on their interpersonal relationship with the listener. Common greetings in Japanese such as yoroshiku onegaishimasu (よろしくお願いします; I make a request and I hope things go well) highlight the debt-sensitive culture in Japan. By emphasizing the speaker's debt to giving credit to the listener, one implies the debt will be repaid, this is rooted in the Japanese concept of face. In addition, phrases such as sumimasen (すみません), originally an expression for apology but encompasses feelings of both gratitude and apology, are used across a variety of contexts, highlighting the use of language to maintain and reinforce smooth face-to-face interactions within Japanese society.

A study investigating the conditions that led to feelings of face-loss in Japanese participants revealed that the presence of others and engagement in activities related to social roles led to a stronger face-loss experience. When examining mentsu in Japan, it was revealed that people generally regard experiences of losing one's own face as unpleasant. Experiences of face-saving and face-loss can influence one's mood and self-esteem. Moreover, people's moods can be influenced by whether the face of those close to them are saved. Findings also reveal that caring for others through saving face can have a positive impact on one's interpersonal relationships with others.

==== Korean ====
The concept of "face" or chemyeon (Korean: 체면; Hanja: 體面; Korean: [/t͡ɕʰe̞mjʌ̹n/]), borrowed from the Chinese tǐmiàn, is extremely important in Korean culture.

=== Persian cultural sphere ===
In Persian, expressions like "Aab ro rizi" (آبروريزی, lit. 'losing the face's water'), is used to mean save face and "Dou roi" (دورويی, lit. 'two-facedness'), "Ro seyahi" (nq, lit. 'Black-facedness') meaning "ashamed and embarrassed" and "Ro sepidi" (روسپيدی, lit. 'white-facedness') meaning "proud" (opposite of Ro seyahi) are used. In Iranian culture the meaning of linguistic face is much closer to the meaning of character. So Persian speakers use some strategies in saving the face or character of each other while they communicate.

=== Southeast Asia ===
==== Burmese (Myanmar) ====
The concept of "face" is important in Burmese society. The Burmese word for face is myet-hna (မျက်နှာ), and is used in many compound words relating to the concept of "face." The doublets myet-hna pyet (မျက်နှာပျက်) and myet-hna phyet (မျက်နှာဖျက်) mean to "lose face" and "to cause the loss of face" respectively. The loss of face is associated with an inability to control one's feelings and lose composure, especially in public.

==== Vietnamese ====
The Vietnamese phrase for saving face is called giữ thế diện or giữ mặ. As Vietnam is classified under the Sinosphere, the Chinese concept of "face" has been introduced to Vietnam during the eras of Bắc thuộc.

==== Khmer (Cambodian) ====
The Khmer word for face is muk (មុខ, lit. 'face'). Bat muk (បាត់មុខ) translates literally as 'lose face'. Tuk muk (ទុកមុខ) translates literally as 'save face' or 'preserve face'. This concept is understood and treated much the same in Cambodia as elsewhere in Asia.

==== Thai ====
The Thai word for face is naa (หน้า, lit. 'face'). There are basically two main ways of expressing loss of face: One, sia naa (เสียหน้า), translates literally as 'lose face.' Another term, khai naa (ขายหน้า) means 'sale of face'. The actual connotation of khai naa is that the person who lost face did so through fault of self or through the thoughtless action of another. As in China and other regions where loss of face is important, the Thai version involves sociodynamic status.

=== Western world ===
==== English ====
The English semantic field for "face" words meaning "prestige; honor" is smaller than the corresponding Chinese field. English face meaning "prestige; honor, respect, dignity, status, reputation, social acceptance, or good name. The "lose" verb in "lose face" means "fail to maintain", while the "save" in "save face" means "avoid loss/damage". The country begins to feel that Government consented to arrangements by which China has lost face; the officials have long been conscious that they are becoming ridiculous in the eyes of the people, seeing that where a foreigner is concerned they can neither enforce a Chinese right, nor redress a Chinese grievance, even on Chinese soil.

Several American newspapers from 1874 listed the concept in a column of "Chinese Proverbs" or "Facts & Fancies" stating "The Chinese, be it observed, are great sticklers for propriety and respectability, and are very much afraid of what they term 'losing face'." Loss of face occurs in The Times (August 3, 1929): "Each wishes to concede only what can be conceded without loss of 'face'".

Save face was coined from lose face applying the semantic opposition between lose and save (Chinese: 保面子; pinyin: bǎo miànzi; lit. 'guard/save face'; when successful, it's called 保住面子; bǎozhu miànzi; 'saved/guarded face').

The Oxford English Dictionary (OED) defines "save face" as: "To keep, protect or guard (a thing) from damage, loss, or destruction", and elaborates,

8f. to save one's face: to avoid being disgraced or humiliated. Similarly, to save (another's) face. Hence save-face adj. = face-saving ... Originally used by the English community in China, with reference to the continual devices among the Chinese to avoid incurring or inflicting disgrace. The exact phrase appears not to occur in Chinese, but ‘to lose face’ (diu lien), and ‘for the sake of his face’, are common.

Among the English words of Chinese origin, lose face is an uncommon verb phrase and a unique semantic loan translation. Most Anglo-Chinese borrowings are nouns, with a few exceptions such as to kowtow, to Shanghai, to brainwash, and lose face. English face, meaning "prestige" or "honor", is the only case of a Chinese semantic loan. Semantic loans extend an indigenous word's meaning in conformity with a foreign model (e.g., the French realiser, lit. 'achieve' or 'create' or 'construct', used in the sense of English realize). The vast majority of English words from Chinese are ordinary loanwords with regular phonemic adaptation (e.g., chop suey < Cantonese tsap-sui 雜碎 lit. 'miscellaneous pieces'). A few are calques where a borrowing is blended with native elements (e.g., chopsticks < Pidgin chop "quick, fast" < Cantonese kap 急 lit. 'quick' + stick). Face meaning "prestige" is technically a loan synonym, owing to semantic overlap between the native English meaning "outward semblance; effrontery" and the borrowed Chinese meaning "prestige; dignity".

When face acquired its Chinese sense of "prestige; honor", it filled a lexical gap in the English lexicon. Chan and Kwok write,

The Chinese has supplied a specific "name" for a "thing" embodying qualities not expressed or possibly not fully expressed, by a number of terms in English. The aptness of the figurative extension has probably also played a part

Carr concludes,

The nearest English synonyms of the apt figurative face are prestige, honor, respect, dignity, status, reputation, social acceptance, or good name. explains how "face" is a more basic meaning than "status", "dignity", or "honor". "Prestige" appears to be semantically closest to "face", however a person can be said to have face but not prestige, or vice versa. Prestige is not necessary; one can easily live without it, but hardly without "face".

==== Russian ====
Russian Orthodox concept of face (лик, лицо, личина) is different from the Chinese concept of face in regards to different emphasis on sanctity and individualism, and in regards to different understanding of the opposites. However, both Russian and Chinese concepts of "face" are close to each other in their focus on person being, first and foremost, part of larger community. In contrast to co-existence of personal individualism with their simultaneous participation in community affairs within Western culture, individuality is much more toned-down in both Russian and Chinese cultures in favour of communality; both Russian and Chinese cultures are lacking in stark Western dichotomy of "internal" vs. "external", and also lacking in Western focus on legal frameworks being foundation for individualism; and instead of it, in both Russian and Chinese cultures ritualism in public relations is much more highly regarded than in Western culture, where in the West ritualism is thought of to be mostly dull and empty of content.

The importance of the concept of face in Russia may be seen imprinted into amassment of proverbs and sayings, where the word лицо is used as a reference to one's character or reputation, for instance упасть в грязь лицом (lit. 'to fall face down into mud') meaning "to lose reputation", двуличие (lit. 'two-facedness' or 'the absence of a well-defined face') denoting a negative trait, потерять лицо, similarly to упасть в грязь лицом, but stronger, meaning to "lose reputation or social standing", and лик meaning both "face" and at the same time "the essence", when being used to describe a person, showing that there is high expectation of "inner self" and "outer self" of a person being in high accord with each other, looking from the framework of Russian culture. Having a лик is opposed to wearing a личина, meaning 'a mask' or 'facade,' which carries a strong negative connotation in Russian culture.

==== South Slavic ====
Among South Slavs, especially in Serbo-Croatian and Bulgarian, the word obraz (образ) is used as a traditional expression for honor and the sociological concept of face. Medieval Slavic documents have shown that the word has been used with various meanings, such as form, image, character, person, symbol, face, figure, statue, idol, guise and mask. The languages also have a derived adjective bezobrazan (безобразан lit. 'without cheek'), used to associate shame to a person.

== Academic interpretations ==
=== Sociology ===
"Face" is central to sociology and sociolinguistics. Martin C. Yang analyzed eight sociological factors in losing or gaining face: the kinds of equality between the people involved, their ages, personal sensibilities, inequality in social status, social relationship, consciousness of personal prestige, presence of a witness, and the particular social value/sanction involved.

The sociologist Erving Goffman introduced the concept of "face" into social theory with his 1955 article "On Face-work: An Analysis of Ritual Elements of Social Interaction" and 1967 book Interaction Ritual: Essays on Face-to-Face Behavior. According to Goffman's dramaturgical perspective, face is a mask that changes depending on the audience and the variety of social interaction. People strive to maintain the face they have created in social situations. They are emotionally attached to their faces, so they feel good when their faces are maintained; loss of face results in emotional pain, so in social interactions people cooperate by using politeness strategies to maintain each other's faces.

Face is sociologically universal. People "are human", Joseph Agassi and I. C. Jarvie believe, "because they have face to care for – without it they lose human dignity." Hu elaborates:

The point is that face is distinctively human. Anyone who does not wish to declare his social bankruptcy must show a regard for face: he must claim for himself, and must extend to others, some degree of compliance, respect, and deference in order to maintain a minimum level of effective social functioning. While it is true that the conceptualization of what constitutes face and the rules governing face behavior vary considerably across cultures, the concern for face is invariant. Defined at a high level of generality, the concept of face is a universal.

The sociological concept of face has recently been reanalyzed through consideration of the Chinese concepts of face (mianzi and lian) which permits deeper understanding of the various dimensions of experience of face, including moral and social evaluation, and its emotional mechanisms.

=== Marketing ===
According to Hu, mianzi stands for "the kind of prestige that is emphasized...a reputation achieved through getting on in life, through success and ostentation", while face is "the respect of a group for a man with a good moral reputation: the man who will fulfill his obligations regardless of the hardships involved, who under all circumstances shows himself a decent human being". The concept seems to relate to two different meanings, from one side Chinese consumers try to increase or maintain their reputation (mianzi) in front of socially and culturally significant others (e.g. friends); on the other hand, they try to defend or save face.

Mianzi is not only important to improve the consumer's reputation in front of significant others, but rather it is also associated with feelings of dignity, honor, and pride. In consumer behaviour literature, mianzi has been used to explain Chinese consumer purchasing behaviour and brand choice and considered it as a quality owned by some brands. Some consumers tend to favour some brands (and their products and services) because of their capacity to enable them to gain mianzi, which does not mean simply increase their reputation but also to show achievements and communicate these achievements to others in order to be more accepted in social circles, especially upper class circles. Chinese consumers tend to believe that if they buy some brands it is easier to be accepted in the social circles of powerful and wealthy people. Connections are particularly important in Chinese culture as people use social connections to achieve their goals.

However, mianzi has also an emotional facet. Consumers feel proud, special, honoured, even more valuable as individuals if they can afford to buy brands that can enhance their mianzi. Therefore, some branded products and services, especially those that require conspicuous consumption (e.g. smartphones, bags, shoes), are chosen because they foster feelings of pride and vanity in the owner.

A brand that enables an individual to achieve such goals in life, in branding literature, it is labelled as 'brand mianzi', which is the capacity of a brand to provide emotions and self-enhancement to its owner.

Scholars have proved that brand mianzi affects consumer purchase intentions and brand equity.

In summary, mianzi is a cultural concept that relates to the social, emotional and psychological dimension of consumption and has an impact on consumers’ perception of their self and purchase decisions. Purchase and consumption of brands (but also other activities, like choosing a specific university), in Chinese culture, are profoundly affected by mianzi and different brands can be more or less apt to enhance or maintain mianzi, while others can cause a loss of face.

=== Politeness theory ===
Penelope Brown and Stephen C. Levinson (1987) expanded Goffman's theory of face in their politeness theory, which differentiated between positive and negative face (p. 61).

- Positive face is "the positive consistent self-image or 'personality' (crucially including the desire that this self-image be appreciated and approved of) claimed by interactants"
- Negative face is "the basic claim to territories, personal preserves, rights to non-distraction—i.e., to freedom of action and freedom from imposition"

In human interactions, people are often forced to threaten either an addressee's positive and/or negative face, and so there are various politeness strategies to mitigate those face-threatening acts.

However, researchers disagree on the universality of Politeness Theory, arguing it fails to consider the cultural origins of the face and behaviors in non-western cultures where interactions focus on group identity rather than individuality.

For instance, the Chinese origins of “face” was not considered by Brown and Levinson. Concerning the concept of negative face, obtaining mianzi in Chinese culture results in the recognition of one's claim to respect from the community, not freedom of action . Japanese researcher claims the concept of negative face is alien to Japanese culture, and mistakenly assume the basic unit of society is the individual which is incongruent with the importance placed on interpersonal relationships in Japanese culture. In the case of Japan, individuals obtain face to maintain one's position in relation to other members of the same community.

These differences suggest the concept of face according to the Politeness Theory is centered around the ideal individual autonomy. However, the concept of face in Eastern cultures such as the Chinese and Japanese orientate towards social identity.

=== Communication theory ===
Tae-Seop Lim and John Waite Bowers (1991) claim that face is the public image that a person claims for himself. Within this claim there are three dimensions. "Autonomy face" describes a desire to appear independent, in control, and responsible. "Fellowship face" describes a desire to seem cooperative, accepted, and loved. "Competence face" describes a desire to appear intelligent, accomplished, and capable. Oetzel et al. (2000) defined "facework" as "the communicative strategies one uses to enact self-face and to uphold, support, or challenge another person's face". In terms of interpersonal communication, Facework refers to an individual's identity in a social world and how that identity is created, reinforced, diminished, and maintained in communicative interactions.

=== Facework ===
Facework represents the transition from the real self of the individual to the image he or she represents to society for communicative or leadership purposes. This concept is all about presentation of the dignified image which soon will become as an authority for other individuals. Facework is a skill of constantly maintaining the face in order to deserve the respect and honor from it. For instance, individualistic cultures like United States, Canada, and Germany are standing for the position of protecting the self-face of the individual while collectivist cultures such as China, South Korea, and Japan support the idea of maintaining the other-face for self-dignity and self-respect.

There are also exist other facework strategies not always basing on the culture strategies like face-negotiating, face-constituting, face-compensating, face-honoring, face-saving, face-threatening, face-building, face-protecting, face-depreciating, face-giving, face-restoring, and face-neutral.

=== Intercultural communication ===
Face is central to intercultural communication or cross-cultural communication. Bert Brown explains the importance of both personal and national face in international negotiations:

Among the most troublesome kinds of problems that arise in negotiation are the intangible issues related to loss of face. In some instances, protecting against loss of face becomes so central an issue that it swamps the importance of the tangible issues at stake and generates intense conflicts that can impede progress toward agreement and increase substantially the costs of conflict resolution.

In terms of Edward T. Hall's dichotomy between high context cultures focused upon in-groups and low context cultures focused upon individuals, face-saving is generally viewed as more important in high context cultures such as China or Japan than in low-context ones such as the United States or Germany.

=== Face-negotiation theory ===
Stella Ting-Toomey developed Face Negotiation Theory to explain cultural differences in communication and conflict resolution. Ting-Toomey defines face as:

[...] the interaction between the degree of threats or considerations one party offers to another party, and the degree of claim for a sense of self-respect (or demand for respect toward one's national image or cultural group) put forth by the other party in a given situation.

=== Psychology ===
The psychology of "face" is another field of research. Wolfram Eberhard, who analyzed Chinese "guilt" and "sin" in terms of literary psychology, debunked the persistent myth that "face" is peculiar to the Chinese rather than a force in every human society. Eberhard noted

It is mainly in the writings of foreigners that we find the stress upon shame in Chinese society; it is they who stated that the Chinese were typically afraid of "losing their face". It is they who reported many cases of suicide because of loss of face, or of suicide in order to punish another person after one's death as a ghost, or to cause through suicide endless difficulties or even punishment to the other person. But in the Chinese literature used here, including also the short stories, I did not once find the phrase "losing face"; and there was no clear case of suicide because of shame alone.

The Chinese University of Hong Kong social psychologist Michael Harris Bond observed that in Hong Kong,

Given the importance of having face and of being related to those who do, there is a plethora of relationship politics in Chinese culture. Name dropping, eagerness to associate with the rich and famous, the use of external status symbols, sensitivity to insult, lavish gift-giving, the use of titles, the sedulous avoidance of criticism, all abound, and require considerable readjustment for someone used to organizing social life by impersonal rules, frankness, and greater equality.

=== Political science ===
"Face" has further applications in political science. For instance, Susan Pharr stressed the importance of "losing face" in Japanese comparative politics.

=== Semantics ===
Linguists have analyzed the semantics of "face". Huang used prototype semantics to differentiate lian and mianzi. George Lakoff and Mark Johnson's Metaphors We Live By emphasizes "the face for the person" metonymy. Keith Allan (1986) extended "face" into theoretical semantics. He postulated it to be an essential element of all language interchanges, and claimed: "A satisfactory theory of linguistic meaning cannot ignore questions of face presentation, nor other politeness phenomena that maintain the co-operative nature of language interchange."

== See also ==
- Dignitas (Roman concept)
- Shame society vs guilt society
- Honor killing
- Izzat (honour)
