= Melissa Bowerman =

Dutch linguist

- Born: April 3, 1942
- Died: October 31, 2011 (aged 69)
- Education: Harvard University (PhD)
- Occupations: Linguist; researcher

Melissa Bowerman (April 3, 1942 – October 31, 2011) was a leading researcher in the area of language acquisition. From 1982 to 2007, she was a senior research fellow at the Max Planck Institute for Psycholinguistics.

== Education and career ==
In 1971, Bowerman earned her PhD in social psychology from Harvard University, where she studied under Roger Brown. She held positions at the University of Kansas from 1970 until 1982, when she joined the Max Planck Institute.

Within the field of language acquisition, she specialized in the relationships between language and cognition, language and spatial representation, and language and event representation. Recurrent themes in her work included the relationship between conceptual development and language development, the use of cross-linguistic comparisons to disentangle what is universal and possibly innate from what is learned, the nature of children's early linguistic rules, and the potential of information about language acquisition to help decide among alternative theoretical approaches to language structure.

Bowerman was elected a fellow of the American Academy of Arts and Sciences on 1 October 2011. A volume of papers in her honor, Routes to Language, was published by Psychology Press in 2015.

== Key publications ==
- Bowerman, Melissa. 1973. Early syntactic development: a cross-linguistic study with special reference to Finnish. Cambridge: Cambridge University Press.
- Choi, S., Bowerman, M., Learning to express motion events in English and Korean: The influence of language-specific lexicalization patterns, (1991) Cognition, 41 (1-3), pp. 83–121.
- Majid, A., Bowerman, M., Kita, S., Haun, D.B.M., Levinson, S.C., Can language restructure cognition? The case for space, (2004) Trends in Cognitive Sciences, 8 (3), pp. 108–114.
- Choi, S., McDonough, L., Bowerman, M., Mandler, J.M., Early Sensitivity to Language-Specific Spatial Categories in English and Korean, (1999) Cognitive Development, 14 (2), pp. 241–268.
- Bowerman, Melissa, and Stephen C. Levinson, eds. 2001. Language Acquisition and Conceptual Development. Cambridge: Cambridge University Press.
- Majid, A., Bowerman, M., Van Staden, M., Boster, J.S., The semantic categories of cutting and breaking events: A crosslinguistic perspective, (2007) Cognitive Linguistics, 18 (2), pp. 133–152.
- Bowerman, Melissa, and Penelope Brown, eds. 2008. Crosslinguistic Perspectives on Argument Structure. New York: Lawrence Erlbaum Associates.
