= Hedge (linguistics) =

Spoken phrase used to reduce intensity

In linguistics (particularly sub-fields like applied linguistics and pragmatics), a hedge is a word or phrase used in a sentence to express ambiguity, probability, caution, or indecisiveness about the remainder of the sentence, rather than full accuracy, certainty, confidence, or decisiveness. Hedges can also allow speakers and writers to introduce (or occasionally even eliminate) ambiguity in meaning and typicality as a category member. Hedging in category membership is used in reference to the prototype theory, to signify the extent to which items are typical or atypical members of different categories. Hedges might be used in writing, to downplay a harsh critique or a generalization, or in speaking, to lessen the impact of an utterance due to politeness constraints between a speaker and addressee.

Typically, hedges are adjectives or adverbs, but can also consist of clauses such as one use of tag questions. In some cases, a hedge could be regarded as a form of euphemism. Linguists consider hedges to be tools of epistemic modality; allowing speakers and writers to signal a level of caution in making an assertion. Hedges are also used to distinguish items into multiple categories, where items can be in a certain category to an extent.

== Types of hedges ==
Hedges may take the form of many different parts of speech, for example:

- There might just be a few insignificant problems we need to address. (adjective)
- The party was somewhat spoiled by the return of the parents. (adverb)
- I'm not an expert but you might want to try restarting your computer. (clause)
- That's false, isn't it? (tag question clause)

== Using hedges ==
Hedges are often used in everyday speech, and they can serve many different purposes. Below are a few ways to use hedges with examples to clarify these different functions.

=== Category membership ===
A very common use of hedges can be found in signaling the typicality of category membership. Different hedges can signal prototypical membership in a category, meaning that the member has most of the characteristics that are exemplary of the category. For example;

- A robin is a bird par excellence.
  - This signifies that a robin has all of the typical characteristics of a bird, i.e. feathers, small, lives in a nest, etc.
- Loosely speaking, a bat is a bird.
  - This sentence displays that a bat could technically be called a bird, but the hedge loosely speaking signifies that a bat has fringe membership in the category "bird".

=== Epistemic hedges ===
In some cases, "I don't know" functions as a prepositioned hedge—a forward-looking stance marker displaying that the speaker is not fully committed to what follows in their turn of talk.

Hedges may intentionally or unintentionally be employed in both spoken and written language since they are crucially important in communication. Hedges help speakers and writers indicate more precisely how the cooperative principle (expectations of quantity, quality, manner, and relevance) is observed in assessments. For example,

- All I know is smoking is harmful to your health.
  - Here, it can be observed that information conveyed by the speaker is limited by adding all I know. By so saying, the speaker wants to inform that they are not only making an assertion but observing the maxim of quantity as well.
- They told me that they are married.
  - If the speaker were to say simply They are married and did not know for sure if that were the case, they might violate the maxim of quality, since they were saying something that they do not know to be true or false. By prefacing the remark with They told me that, the speaker wants to confirm that they are observing the conversational maxim of quality.
- I am not sure if all of these are clear to you, but this is what I know.
  - The above example shows that hedges are good indications the speakers are not only conscious of the maxim of manner, but they are also trying to observe them.
- By the way, you like this car?
  - By using by the way, what has been said by the speakers is not relevant to the moment in which the conversation takes place. Such a hedge can be found in the middle of speakers' conversation as the speaker wants to switch to another topic that is different from the previous one. Therefore, by the way functions as a hedge indicating that the speaker wants to drift into another topic or to stop the previous topic.

=== Hedges in non-English languages ===
Hedges are used as a tool of communication and are found in all of the world's languages. Examples of hedges in languages besides English are as follow:

- genre (French)
  - Il était, genre, grand (He was, like, tall.)
- eigentlich (German)
- După câte am înțeles (Romanian)
  - După câte am înțeles, sora dumneavoastră crede că omul nu poate iubi decât o singură dată în viață. (As I understand it, your sister thinks that man can only love once in his life.)

When this phrase has full syntactic complementation, speakers emphasize their lack of knowledge or display reluctance to answer. However, without an object complement, speakers display uncertainty about the truth of the following proposition or about its sufficiency as an answer.

=== Hedges in fuzzy language ===
Hedges are generally used to either add or take away fuzziness or obscurity in a given situation, often through the use of modal auxiliaries or approximates. Fuzzy language refers to the strategic manipulation of hedges so as to deliberately introduce ambiguity into a statement. Hedges can also be used to express sarcasm as a way of making sentences more vague in written form.

- Sapphire works really hard.
  - In this sentence, the word really can make the sentence fuzzy depending on the tone of the sentence. It could be serious (where Sapphire really is hard-working and deserves a raise or promotion) or sarcastic (where Sapphire is not contributing to the work).
- Lillian sure nailed her phonetics exam.
  - In this sentence, sure is used sarcastically to create vagueness.

=== Evasive hedging ===
Hedging can be used as an evasive tool. For example, when expectations are not met or when people want to avoid answering a question. This is seen below:

- A: What did you think of Steve?
  B: As far as I can tell, he seems like a good guy.
- A: What did you think about Erica's presentation?
  B: I mean, it wasn't the best.

=== Hedges and politeness ===
Hedges can also be used to politely respond negatively to commands and requests by others.

- A: Are you coming to my ceremony tonight?
  B: I might, I'll have to see.
- A: Did you like that book?
  B: Personally, it wasn't my favorite, but it isn't bad I suppose.

=== Incorrect usage of hedges ===
There are cases in which particular hedges cannot be used or are considered strange given the context.

- Correct: Loosely speaking, my computer is also my television.
- Incorrect: Loosely speaking, my computer is an electronic device.

In the first sentence, 'loosely speaking' is used correctly, as it precedes a somewhat inaccurate, perhaps interpretive picture of the computer's identity. In the second sentence, 'loosely speaking' is used when the phrase 'broadly speaking' would be more apt: the description itself is accurate, but more general in nature.

=== Hedging strategies ===
- Indetermination – serves to augment the uncertainty of a statement or response
- Depersonalisation – circumvents the use of direct reference of a specific subject, creating fuzziness around who referent of the sentence is
- Subjectivisation – to use verbs regarding the action of thought to express subjectivity about a claim (such as to suppose, think, or guess)
- Limitation – narrowing the category membership of a subject in order to add clarity

== See also ==
- Polite fiction
- Euphemism
- Epistemic modality
