= Penelope Brown =

American anthropological linguist

Penelope Brown (born 1944 in Summit, NJ) is an American anthropological linguist who has studied a number of aspects of cross-linguistic, sociolinguistic, and cross-cultural studies of language and cognition.

== Education and career ==
Brown earned a BA in Psychology from Carleton College 1965 and an M.A. in Anthropology and Linguistics from the University of Iowa in 1970. She earned a PhD in Anthropology from the University of California, Berkeley in 1979 under the supervision of John J. Gumperz. Her dissertation is titled, "Language, interaction, and sex roles in a Mayan community: a study of politeness and the position of women."

Brown was the co-developer of the theory of politeness, a key topic in 20th century sociolinguistics. With her research collaborator and husband, linguist Stephen Levinson, she is co-author of the seminal work, Politeness: Some Universals in Language Usage (cited more than 40,000 times). This book was first published in 1978 (and was republished with a new introduction, corrections, and a new bibliography in 1987).

Brown worked in the field for a number of years with Tzeltel Maya speakers in Mexico, and has also worked in Rossel Island in Papua New Guinea.

She is currently an emeritus member of the Language Acquisition Department at the Max Planck Institute for Psycholinguistics in Nijmegen.

== Honors and awards ==
She earned the Stirling Prize for Best Work in Psychological Anthropology in 1992.

== Key publications ==
- Tanya Stivers, N.J. Enfield, Penolpe Brown, Christina Englert, Makoto Hayashi, Trine Heinemann, Gertie Hoymann, Federico Rossano, Jan Peter de Ruiter, Kyung-Eun Yoon. and Stephen C. Levinson. 2009. Universals and cultural variation in turn-taking in conversation. Proceedings of the National Academy of Sciences of the United States of America.
- Melissa Bowerman and Penelope Brown (eds.) 2008. Crosslinguistic Perspectives on Argument Structure. Taylor and Francis.
- Penelope Brown and Stephen C. Levinson. 1987. Politeness: Some universals in language usage. Cambridge University Press.
- Penelope Brown. 1980. How and why are women more polite: Some evidence from a Mayan community. Women and language in literature and society. Preager Publishers. pp. 111–136.
- Penelope Brown and Stephen C. Levinson. 1978. Universals in language usage: Politeness phenomena. Questions and politeness: strategies in social interaction. Cambridge University Press. pp. 56–311.
- Gillian Sankoff and Penelope Brown. 1976. The origins of syntax in discourse: A case study of Tok Pisin relatives. Language 52:3 pp. 631–666.
