= Stephen Levinson =

British social scientist

Stephen Levinson FBA
- Born: Stephen Curtis Levinson; December 6, 1947 (age 78); London, England, UK
- Occupation: Social scientist
- Spouse: Penelope Brown

Academic background
- Education: King's College, Cambridge; University of California, Berkeley
- Thesis: Social Deixis in a Tamil Village (1977)

Academic work
- Institutions: University of Cambridge; Max Planck Institute for Psycholinguistics

Stephen Curtis Levinson FBA (born 6 December 1947) is a British social scientist, known for his studies of the relations between culture, language and cognition, and former scientific director of the Language and Cognition department at the Max Planck Institute for Psycholinguistics in Nijmegen, the Netherlands.

Levinson was born in London, England and educated at Bedales School and King's College, Cambridge, where he received a BA in Archaeology and Social Anthropology, and University of California, Berkeley, where he received a PhD in Linguistic Anthropology. He has held posts at the University of Cambridge, Stanford University and the Australian National University, and is currently Professor of Comparative Linguistics at Radboud University. In December 2017, he retired as director of the Language and Cognition department at the Max Planck Institute for Psycholinguistics. Among other distinctions, he was elected Fellow of the British Academy in 1988, was winner of the 1992 Stirling Prize, Fellow-elect of the Stanford Center for Advanced Study in the Behavioral Sciences, member of the Academia Europaea since 2003, and 2009 Hale Professor of the Linguistic Society of America. In 2017 Levinson received an honorary doctorate award from Uppsala University. From 2018 to 2023 he was president of the International Pragmatics Association.

== Career ==
Levinson's earliest work was with John Gumperz in interactional sociolinguistics, studying the interaction patterns in a multilingual community in India. His work with Penelope Brown on language structures related to formality and politeness across the world led to the publication of Politeness: Universals in Language Usage (1978/1987), a foundational work in politeness theory. From 1991 onward Levinson has led his own research lab, funded by the Max Planck Society and based at the Max Planck Institute for Psycholinguistics. Work in his Language and Cognition group (formerly Cognitive Anthropology research group) focuses on linguistic diversity and its importance to cognitive science. The department has also done work connecting typology with Conversation Analysis through studies on e.g. repair and sequence organization across a wide variety of language. This has also led to lesser studied languages being taken into account in Interactional linguistics.

== Books and Written Works ==
He has written extensively on pragmatics, producing the first comprehensive textbook in the field (1983). He locates his work on pragmatics under what he has called the Gricean umbrella (2000:12ff.), a broad theory of communication that focuses on the role of conversational implicatures. LSA 2009, L&C Field Manuals and Stimulus Materials In 2009, Levinson co-wrote (with Nicholas Evans) a hotly debated article contesting the existence of non-trivial linguistic universals and arguing that linguistic diversity is a crucial datum for cognitive science. Levinson was one of the driving forces behind a re-evaluation of the notion of linguistic relativity in the early nineties, publishing (with Gumperz) an influential review of the issue (Current Anthropology, 1991) and co-editing (with Gumperz) a volume on the topic with contributions of experts from various fields (Gumperz & Levinson 1996). An influential paper with Penelope Brown titled Immanuel Kant among the Tenejapans. His recent work describes the relations between culture of the inhabitants of Rossel Island, and their Yélî Dnye language.

Pragmatics, one of Stephen Levinson's books, is considered an important and effective text by academic reviewers. It is agreed that the book adequately covers the subject pragmatics as well as other subtopics such as presuppositions and conversational implicature. Though new fields of pragmatics and different perspectives on the subject could result in new ideas and questions, Pragmatics is a solid foundation and introduction to pragmatics, according to critics. The book is seen as an impactful one to the field of pragmatics.

== Awards and Honors ==
Stephen Levinson accompanied several awards from the late 1900's to early 2000's. In 1970, Levinson was named Senior Scholar at King's College, Cambridge, earning a Fulbright Award the same year. He became a member of High Table, King's College, Cambridge in 1975. In 1987, Levinson obtained the position as a professor at Stanford University in the Linguistic Society of America's Linguistics Institute. Subsequently in 1988, he was presented as a Fellow of the British Academy. In 1992, he was awarded the Stirling Prize from the American Anthropological Association. In Gothenburg, Sweden Levinson delivered the Stern Lectures during 1998. In 2001, he served as a professor at the University of California, Santa Barbara. Teaching at the Linguistic Society of America's Linguistics Institute. That same year he was given the name, Fellow Elect at Stanford University's Center for Advanced Study in the Behavioral Sciences. In 2003 he became a Member of the Academia Europaea. Lastly Levinson held the position as, Hale Professor in 2009 in the Linguistic Society of America.

== References cited and notable publications ==
- Levinson, Stephen C. (1983). Pragmatics. Cambridge Textbooks in Linguistics. Cambridge: Cambridge University Press. ISBN 0-521-22235-4.
- Brown, Penelope; Stephen C. Levinson (1987). Politeness: Some Universals in Language Usage. Studies in interactional sociolinguistics. Cambridge: Cambridge University Press. ISBN 0-521-30862-3.
- Levinson, Stephen C.; Penelope Brown (1993). "Background to "Immanuel Kant among the Tenejapans"". Anthropology Newsletter. 34 (3): 22–23.
- Levinson, Stephen C.; Penelope Brown (1994). "Immanuel Kant among the Tenejapans: Anthropology as empirical philosophy". Ethos. 22 (1): 3–41. doi:10.1525/eth.1994.22.1.02a00010. hdl:11858/00-001M-0000-0013-2BBD-2. JSTOR 640467.
- Levinson, Stephen C. (2000). Presumptive Meanings: The Theory of Generalized Conversational Implicature. MIT Press.
- Levinson, Stephen C. (2003). Space in language and cognition: explorations in cognitive diversity. Cambridge: Cambridge University Press.
- Evans, Nicholas; Stephen C. Levinson (2009). "The Myth of Language Universals: Language diversity and its importance for cognitive science". Behavioral and Brain Sciences. 32 (5): 429–492. doi:10.1017/S0140525X0999094X. hdl:11858/00-001M-0000-0012-C29E-4. PMID 19857320.
- Gumperz, John J.; Stephen C. Levinson (December 1991). "Rethinking Linguistic Relativity" (PDF). Current Anthropology. 32 (5): 613–623. doi:10.1086/204009. ISSN 0011-3204. JSTOR 2743696. S2CID 162295567.
- Levinson, Stephen C.; Pierre Jaisson (2006). Evolution and culture. Cambridge, MA: MIT Press.
- Levinson, Stephen C.; David P. Wilkins (2006). Grammars of space. Cambridge: Cambridge University Press.
