= Implicature =

Information conveyed verbally yet not literally

In pragmatics, a subdiscipline of linguistics, an implicature is something the speaker suggests or implies with an utterance, even though it is not literally expressed. Implicatures can aid in communicating more efficiently than by explicitly saying everything we want to communicate. The philosopher H. P. Grice coined the term in 1975. Grice distinguished conversational implicatures, which arise because speakers are expected to respect general rules of conversation, and conventional ones, which are tied to certain words such as but or therefore. Take for example the following exchange:

A (to passerby): I am out of gas.
B: There is a gas station 'round the corner.

Here, B does not say, but conversationally implicates, that the gas station is open, because otherwise his utterance would not be relevant in the context. Conversational implicatures are classically seen as contrasting with entailments: they are not necessary or logical consequences of what is said, but are defeasible (cancellable). So, B could continue without contradiction:

B: But unfortunately it's closed today.

An example of a conventional implicature is "Donovan is poor but happy", where the word but implicates a sense of contrast between being poor and being happy.

Later linguists introduced and refined different definitions of the term, leading to somewhat different ideas about which parts of the information conveyed by an utterance are actually implicatures and which are not.

== Conversational implicature ==
Grice was primarily concerned with conversational implicatures. Like all implicatures, these are part of what is communicated. In other words, conclusions the addressee draws from an utterance although they were not actively conveyed by the communicator are never implicatures. According to Grice, conversational implicatures arise because communicating people are expected by their addressees to obey the maxims of conversation and the overarching cooperative principle, which basically states that people are expected to communicate in a cooperative, helpful way.

The cooperative principle Make your contribution such as is required, at the stage at which it occurs, by the accepted purpose or direction of the talk exchange in which you are engaged.
The maxims of conversation
The maxim of Quality
try to make your contribution one that is true, specifically:
(i) do not say what you believe to be false
(ii) do not say that for which you lack adequate evidence
The maxim of Quantity
(i) make your contribution as informative as is required for the current purposes of the exchange
(ii) do not make your contribution more informative than is required
The maxim of Relation (or Relevance)
make your contributions relevant
The maxim of Manner
be perspicuous, and specifically:
(i) avoid obscurity
(ii) avoid ambiguity
(iii) be brief (avoid unnecessary prolixity)
(iv) be orderly

— Grice (1975:26–27), Levinson (1983:100–102)

=== Standard implicatures ===
The simplest situation is where the addressee can draw conclusions from the assumption that the communicator obeys the maxims, as in the following examples. The symbol "+>" means "implicates".

Quality
It is raining. +> I believe, and have adequate evidence, that it is raining.

Moore's paradox, the observation that the sentence "It is raining, but I don't believe that it is raining" sounds contradictory although it is not from a strictly logical point of view, has been explained as a contradiction to this type of implicature. However, as implicatures can be cancelled (see below), this explanation is dubious.

Quantity (i)

A well-known class of quantity implicatures are the scalar implicatures. Prototypical examples include words specifying quantities such as some, few, or many:

John ate some of the cookies. +> John didn't eat all of the cookies.

Here, the use of some semantically entails that more than one cookie was eaten. It does not entail, but implicates, that not every cookie was eaten, or at least that the speaker does not know whether any cookies are left. The reason for this implicature is that saying some when one could say all would be less than informative enough in most circumstances. The general idea is that the communicator is expected to make the strongest possible claim, implicating the negation of any stronger claim. Lists of expressions that give rise to scalar implicatures, sorted from strong to weak, are known as Horn scales:

- all, many, some, few
- ..., four, three, two, one (cardinal number terms)
- always, often, sometimes
- and, or
- necessarily, possibly
- hot, warm
- etc.

Negation reverses these scales, as in this example:

She won't necessarily get the job. +> She will possibly get the job.

"Not possibly" is stronger than "not necessarily", and the implicature follows from the double negation "She will not [not possibly] get the job".

Here are some further implicatures that can be classified as scalar:

I slept on a boat yesterday. +> The boat was not mine.

This is a common construction where the indefinite article indicates that the referent is not closely associated with the speaker, because the stronger claim "I slept on my boat yesterday" is not made.

The flag is green. +> The flag is completely green.

If this is the strongest possible claim, it follows that the flag has no other features, because "The flag is green and some other colour" would be stronger. In other words, if it did contain other features, this utterance would not be informative enough.

Quantity (ii)

The second quantity maxim seems to work in the opposite direction as the first; the communicator makes a weaker claim, from which a stronger one is implicated. Implicatures arising from this maxim enrich the information contained in the utterance:

He drank a bottle of vodka and fell into a stupor. +> He drank a bottle of vodka and consequently fell into a stupor.
I lost a book yesterday. +> The book was mine.

There is extensive literature, but no consensus on the question which of the two quantity maxims is in operation in which circumstances; i.e. why "I lost a book yesterday" implicates that the book was the speaker's, while "I slept on a boat yesterday" usually implicates that the boat wasn't the speaker's.

Relation/relevance
That cake looks delicious. +> I would like a piece of that cake.

This statement taken by itself would be irrelevant in most situations, so the addressee concludes that the speaker had something more in mind.

The introductory example also belongs here:

A: I am out of gas. +> I need to get gas.
B: There is a gas station 'round the corner. +> The gas station is open.

Manner (iv)
The cowboy jumped on his horse and rode into the sunset. +> The cowboy performed these two actions in this order.

Being orderly includes relating events in the order they occurred.

=== Clashes of maxims ===
Sometimes it is impossible to obey all maxims at once. Suppose that A and B are planning a holiday in France and A suggests they visit their old acquaintance Gérard:

A: Where does Gérard live?
B: Somewhere in the South of France. +> B does not know where exactly Gérard lives.

B's answer violates the first maxim of quantity as it does not contain sufficient information to plan their route. But if B does not know the exact location, she cannot obey this maxim and also the maxim of quality; hence the implicature.

=== Floutings ===
The maxims can also be blatantly disobeyed or flouted, giving rise to another kind of conversational implicature. This is possible because addressees will go to great lengths in saving their assumption that the communicator did in fact – perhaps on a deeper level – obey the maxims and the cooperative principle. Many figures of speech can be explained by this mechanism.

Quality (i)

Saying something that is obviously false can produce irony, meiosis, hyperbole and metaphor:

When she heard about the rumour, she exploded.

As it is improbable that she really exploded, and it is highly unlikely that the speaker wanted to lie or was simply mistaken, the addressee has to assume the utterance was meant to be metaphorical.

Quantity (i)

Utterances that are not informative on the surface include tautologies. They have no logical content and hence no entailments, but can still be used to convey information via implicatures:

War is war.

Damning with faint praise also works by flouting the first quantity maxim. Consider the following testimonial for a philosophy student:

Dear Sir, Mr. X's command of English is excellent, and his attendance at tutorials has been regular. Yours, etc.

The implicature here is that the student is no good, since the teacher has nothing better to say about him.

Relation/relevance

B's answer in the following exchange does not seem to be relevant, so A concludes that B wanted to convey something else:

A: Mrs Jenkins is an old windbag, don't you think?
B: Lovely weather for March, isn't it? +> Watch out, her nephew is standing right behind you! (or the like)

Manner (iii)

This utterance is much more long-winded than "Miss Singer sang an aria from Rigoletto" and therefore flouts the maxim "Be brief":

Miss Singer produced a series of sounds corresponding closely to the score of an aria from Rigoletto. +> What Miss Singer produced cannot really be described as an aria from Rigoletto.

=== Particularized versus generalized implicatures ===
Conversational implicatures that arise only in specific contexts are called particularized, while those that are not or only slightly context dependent are generalized. Many of the examples above rely on some context, making them particularized implicatures: thus, "War is war" can refer to different properties of war, or things expected to happen during war, depending on the situation in which it is uttered. Prototypical examples of generalized implicatures are the scalar implicatures. Particularized implicatures are by far the more common kind.

=== Properties ===
Grice attributed a number of properties to conversational implicatures:

They are defeasible (cancellable), meaning that the implicature may be cancelled by further information or context. Take the examples from above:

That cake looks delicious. +> I would like a piece of that cake.
versus: That cake looks delicious, but it looks too rich for me. (implicature defeated)

A: Did John eat some of the cookies?
B: He certainly did eat some of the cookies. In fact he ate them all.

They are usually non-detachable in the sense that they cannot be "detached" by rephrasing the utterance, as they are consequences of the meaning and not the wording. The obvious exception are implicatures following from the maxim of manner, which explicitly relies on the phrasing. Thus, the following utterances have the same implicature as above:

That fruit cake there looks appetizing.
The dessert you brought is really mouthwatering.

Conversational implicatures are calculable: they are supposed to be formally derivable from the literal meaning of the utterance in combination with the cooperative principle and the maxims, as well as contextual information and background knowledge.

They are non-conventional, that is, they are not part of the "conventional" (lexical and logical) meaning of a sentence.

Lastly, they can be context dependent, as mentioned above.

=== Opting out of the cooperative principle ===
The cooperative principle and the maxims of conversation are not mandatory. A communicator can choose not to be cooperative; she can opt out of the cooperative principle by giving appropriate clues such as saying "My lips are sealed", or for example during a cross-examination at court. In such situations, no conversational implicatures arise.

=== Modifications to Grice's maxims ===
Laurence Horn

Various modifications to Grice's maxims have been proposed by other linguists, the so-called neo-Griceans. Laurence Horn's approach keeps the maxims of quality and replaces the other maxims with just two principles:

- The Q-principle: Make your contribution sufficient; say as much as you can (given the quality maxims and the R-principle).
- The R-principle: Make your contribution necessary; say no more than you must (given the Q-principle).

The Q-principle replaces the first quantity maxim ("make your contribution as informative as is required") and the first and second manner maxims ("avoid obscurity and ambiguity"), and is taken to serve the interests of the hearer, who wants as much information as possible. It thus gives rise to the classical scalar implicatures. The R-principle subsumes the second quantity maxim ("do not make your contribution more informative than is required"), the maxim of relation, and the remaining manner maxims ("be brief and orderly"), and serves the interests of the speaker, who wants to communicate with as little effort as possible. These two principles have opposite effects analogous to Grice's two maxims of quantity. To determine which of the two principles is used, Horn introduces the concept of division of pragmatic labor: unmarked (shorter, standard, more lexicalized) phrasings tend to R-implicate a standard meaning, and marked (more wordy, unusual, less lexicalized) phrasings tend to Q-implicate a nonstandard meaning:

She stopped the machine. +> She stopped the machine in the usual way. (R-implicature: a stronger, more specific claim is implicated)
She got the machine to stop. +> She did not stop the machine in the usual way. (Q-implicature: the stronger claim is negated, as with scalar implicatures)

Horn's account has been criticised for misrepresenting the speaker's and hearer's interests: realistically, the hearer does not want a lot of information but just the relevant information; and the speaker is more interested in being understood than in having little work to do. Furthermore, as in Grice's theory, there is often no explanation for when which of the two principles is used, i.e. why "I lost a book yesterday" has the Q-implicature, or scalar implicature, that the book was the speaker's, while "I slept on a boat yesterday" R-implicates that the boat wasn't the speaker's.

Stephen Levinson

Stephen Levinson's approach is similar to Horn's. His Q-principle is basically the same, but its antagonist, the I-principle, only takes the place of the second quantity maxim. There is a separate M-principle more or less corresponding to the third and fourth manner maxims, as well as to Horn's division of pragmatic labor; but there is no replacement for the maxim of relation.

- The M-principle: Indicate abnormal, nonstereotypical situations by using marked expressions that contrast with those you would use to describe the corresponding normal, stereotypical situations.

Levinson subsequently developed a theory of generalized conversational implicature (GCI) based on the Q-principle. He argues that GCIs are distinct from particularized conversational implicatures in that they are inferred via a specialized set of principles and rules that are always in force, independent of the context. If a GCI does not arise in some specific situations, this is because it is blocked under certain circumstances according to Levinson.

=== Criticism ===
Apart from the mentioned problem with the two opposing quantity maxims, several issues with Grice's conversational implicatures have been raised:

Do implicatures contrast with entailments?

While Grice described conversational implicatures as contrasting with entailments, there has since been dissent.

A: Did you drive somewhere yesterday?
B: I drove to London.

Here, B implicates via the maxim of relation that he drove somewhere (as this is the fitting answer to A's question), but this information is also entailed by his answer.

Are quantity implicatures actually implicatures?

At least some scalar and other quantity "implicatures" seem not to be implicatures at all but semantic enrichments of the utterance, what is variously described as an explicature or impliciture in the literature. For example, Kent Bach argues that a sentence like "John ate some of the cookies" does not implicate "John didn't eat all of the cookies" because the latter is not a claim separate from the first; rather, the speaker just has a single meaning in mind, namely "John ate some [but not all] of the cookies". Likewise, Robyn Carston considers cases like "He drank a bottle of vodka and [consequently] fell into a stupor" explicatures; however, she considers the question of classical scalar implicatures ("some, few, many") to be unsettled.

Can metaphors only arise when the first maxim of quality is flouted?

As experimental evidence shows, it is not necessary to evaluate the truth of an utterance's literal meaning in order to recognise a metaphor. An example of a metaphor that is also literally true is a chess player telling his opponent, in appropriate circumstances,

Your defence is an impregnable castle.

Are events always related in order?

Apparent counterexamples to the maxim "be orderly" have been found, such as this:

A: My wife wants me to remove our carpets. She is afraid she might trip and hurt herself, but I think she is just overanxious.
B: Well, I don't know. John broke his leg and he tripped over a doormat.

Are there particularized and generalized implicatures?

Carston observes that particularized and generalized conversational implicatures are not separate categories; rather, there is a continuum from implicatures that are highly dependent on a specific situation which is unlikely to happen twice, to ones that occur very frequently. In her view, the distinction has no theoretical value since all implicatures are derived from the same principles.

Can implicatures only arise when the communicator is cooperative?

Take the above example about Gérard's place of residence. If B knows where Gérard lives, and A knows this, we also get an implicature, although a different one:

A: Where does Gérard live?
B: Somewhere in the South of France. +> B does not want to say where exactly Gérard lives. +> B does not want to visit Gérard.

This contradicts Grice's notion that implicatures can only arise when the communicator observes the cooperative principle.

== Implicature in relevance theory ==
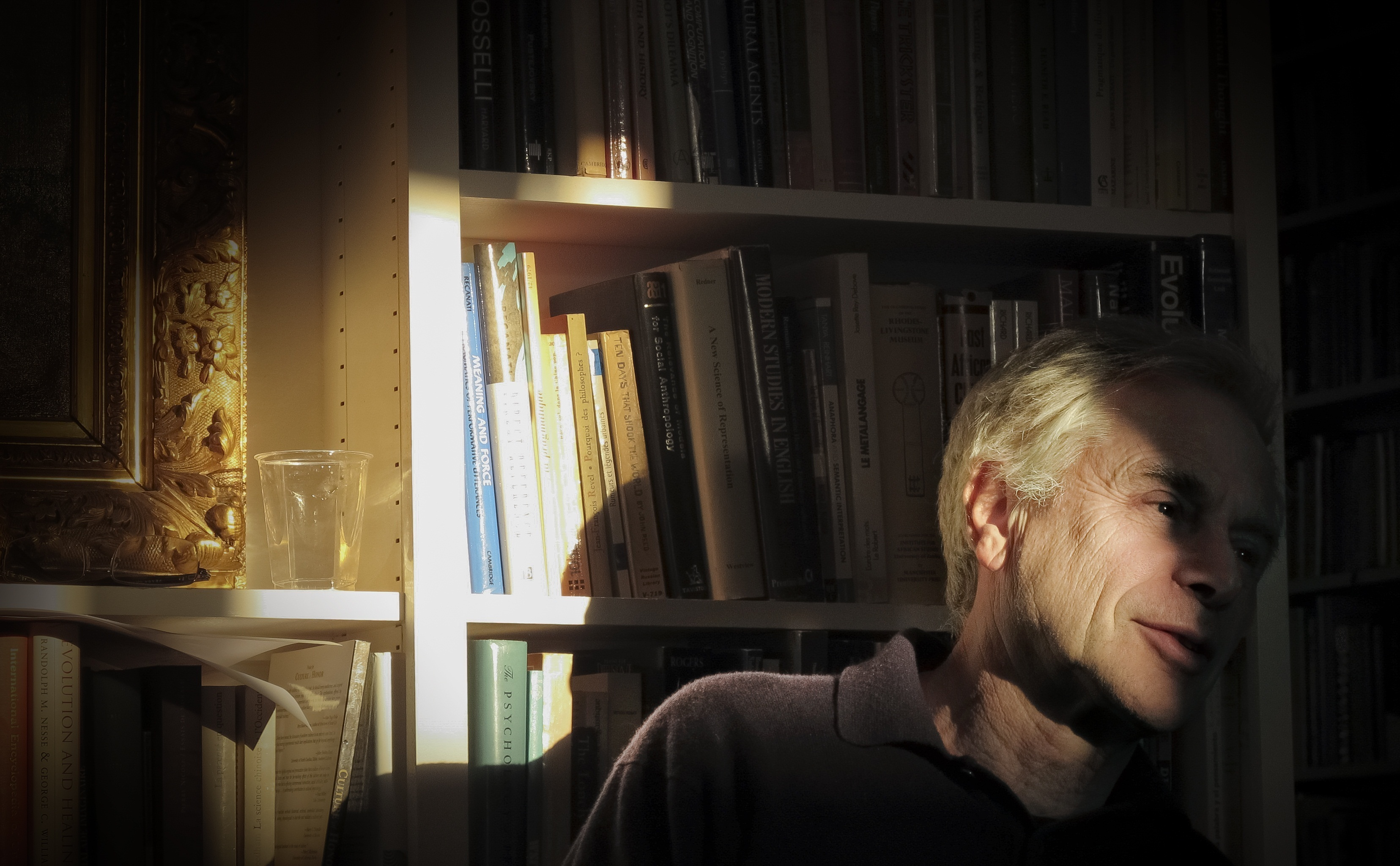
Dan Sperber, who developed relevance theory together with Deirdre Wilson

In the framework known as relevance theory, implicature is defined as a counterpart to explicature. The explicatures of an utterance are the communicated assumptions that are developed from its logical form (intuitively, the literal meaning) by supplying additional information from context: by disambiguating ambiguous expressions, assigning referents to pronouns and other variables, and so on. All communicated assumptions that cannot be obtained in this way are implicatures. For example, if Peter says

Susan told me that her kiwis were too sour.

in the context that Susan participated in a fruit grower's contest, the hearer might arrive at the explicature

Susan told Peter that the kiwifruit she, Susan, grew were too sour for the judges at the fruit grower's contest.

Now assume that Peter and the hearer both have access to the contextual information that

Susan is ambitious. If she loses at something, she's pretty downcast.

and that Peter intended the hearer to activate this knowledge. Then this is an implicated premise. The hearer can now draw the contextual implications that

+> Susan needs to be cheered up.
+> Peter wants me to ring Susan and cheer her up.

If Peter intended the hearer to come to these implications, they are implicated conclusions. Implicated premises and conclusions are the two types of implicatures in the relevance theoretical sense.

There is no sharp cutoff between implicatures, which are part of the intentional meaning of an utterance, and unintended implications the addressee may draw. For example, there may be no consensus whether

?+> Peter wants me to buy Susan some chocolate to cheer her up.

is an implicature of the above utterance. We say this assumption is only weakly implicated, while "Susan needs to be cheered up" is essential for the utterance to achieve relevance for the addressee and is therefore strongly implicated.

=== The principle of relevance ===
Communicative principle of relevance Every utterance conveys the information that it is
(a) relevant enough for it to be worth the addressee's effort to process it.
(b) the most relevant one compatible with the communicator's abilities and preferences.

— adapted from Sperber & Wilson (1995:270)

Both explicatures and implicatures follow from the communicative principle of relevance, which unlike Grice's cooperative principle is not optional, but is always in force whenever someone communicates – it is descriptive of, not prescriptive for, communicative acts. Consequently, implicatures can arise even if, or precisely because, the communicator is uncooperative. Relevance theory can therefore effortlessly account for the above example about Gérard: If B knows where Gérard lives, and "Somewhere in the South of France" is the most relevant answer compatible with B's preferences, it follows that B is unwilling to disclose his knowledge.

=== Distinction from explicatures ===
All pragmatically derived information, including parts of explicatures that are supplied from context, is calculable and defeasible. Therefore, different criteria are needed in relevance theory to identify implicatures.

Sperber and Wilson originally assumed that implicatures can be sufficiently defined as the communicated assumptions that are not developed from an utterance's logical form, as noted above. On this account, loose language use (saying "This steak is raw" to express that it is really undercooked) is a case of implicature, as are hyperbole and metaphor.

Carston has argued for a more formal approach, namely that an utterance's implicatures cannot entail any of its explicatures. If they did, the resulting redundancies would cause unnecessary effort on part of the addressee, which would run against the principle of relevance. An example of pragmatically derived information that has traditionally been seen as an implicature, but must be an explicature according to Carston's reasoning, has already been mentioned above: "He drank a bottle of vodka and fell into a stupor" → "He drank a bottle of vodka and consequently fell into a stupor". However, there has since been found at least one example of an implicature that does entail an explicature, showing that this test is not infallible:

A: Did Jim go to the party?
B: I don't know, but I can tell you that if anybody was there, Jim was there.
A: Somebody was there – this I know for sure. (I saw John going there.) +> Jim was there. (entails: Somebody was there.)

Another possible criterion is that explicatures, but not implicatures, can be embedded in negations, if clauses and other grammatical constructions. Thus, the sentences

Susan did not tell Peter that her kiwis were too sour.
If Susan has told Peter that her kiwis were too sour, she was just fishing for compliments.

are equivalent to

Susan did not tell Peter that the kiwifruit she, Susan, grew were too sour for the judges.
If Susan told Peter that the kiwifruit she, Susan, grew were too sour for the judges, she was just fishing for compliments.

respectively, showing the embedded clause to be an explicature. On the other hand, they are not equivalent to embeddings of the mentioned implicature:

*Susan does not need to be cheered up.
*If Susan needs to be cheered up, she is just fishing for compliments.

These embedding tests also show the vodka bottle example to be an explicature. However, there is still no generally accepted criterion to reliably distinguish explicatures and implicatures.

=== Poetic effects ===
Metaphors can be an efficient means to communicate a wide range of weak implicatures. For example,

Jane is my anchor in the storm.

can weakly implicate that Jane is reliable and stable in difficult circumstances, helpful in calming the speaker, and so on. Even if the speaker had no specific set of assumptions in mind, this information can give the addressee an idea of Jane's significance to the speaker's life.

Speaking generally, utterances convey poetic effects if they achieve all or most of their relevance through a range of weak implicatures. For example, the repetition in

My childhood days are gone, gone.

does not add to the utterance's explicature, prompting the addressee to search for implicatures. To do so, he has to activate contextual (background) information about childhood memories.

Irony is seen as an entirely different phenomenon in relevance theory; see Relevance theory#Interpretation vs. description for an explanation.

=== Criticism ===
Levinson sees relevance theory as too reductionist, as a single principle cannot account for the large variety of implicatures in his view. In particular, he argues that this theory cannot account for generalized implicatures because it is inherently a theory of context dependency. This argument is countered by Carston, as mentioned above. Also, Levinson asserts that relevance theory cannot explain how we arrive at implicated premises via creative processes.

The foundations of relevance theory have been criticised because relevance, in the technical sense it is used there, cannot be measured, so it is not possible to say what exactly is meant by "relevant enough" and "the most relevant".

Carston generally agrees with the relevance theoretic concept of implicature, but argues that Sperber and Wilson let implicatures do too much work. The mentioned embedding tests not only categorize utterances on the likes of the vodka bottle example as explicatures, but also loose use and metaphors:

If your steak is raw, you can send it back.
If Jane is your anchor in the storm, you should let her help you now.

She does not explain metaphors' wide range of effects with weak implicatures. Instead, she advocates the idea that the meaning of words and phrases can be adapted to fit specific contexts; in other words, new concepts that differ from the standard meaning can be constructed ad hoc during communication. In the above metaphor, the phrase "anchor in the storm" has many slightly different ad-hoc meanings, and no specific one is exclusively communicated. Carston also discusses the possibility that metaphors cannot be fully explained by communicated assumptions at all, be they explicatures or implicatures, but with other concepts such as evoking mental images, sensations and feelings.

== Conventional implicature ==
Conventional implicatures, briefly introduced but never elaborated on by Grice, are independent of the cooperative principle and the four maxims. They are instead tied to the conventional meaning of certain particles and phrases such as "but, although, however, nevertheless, moreover, anyway, whereas, after all, even, yet, still, besides", verbs such as "deprive, spare", and possibly also to grammatical structures. (Such words and phrases are also said to trigger conventional implicatures.) In addition, they are not defeasible, but have the force of entailments. An example:

Donovan is poor but happy.

This sentence is logically equivalent to – that is, it has the same truth conditions as – "Donovan is poor and happy". In addition, the word "but" implicates a sense of contrast. Taken together, the sentence means approximately "Surprisingly, Donovan is happy despite being poor".

The verbs "deprive" and "spare" also have the same truth conditions but different conventional implicatures. Compare:

I have deprived you of my lecture. +> Attending my lecture would have been desirable (for you).
I have spared you my lecture. +> Attending my lecture would not have been desirable (for you).

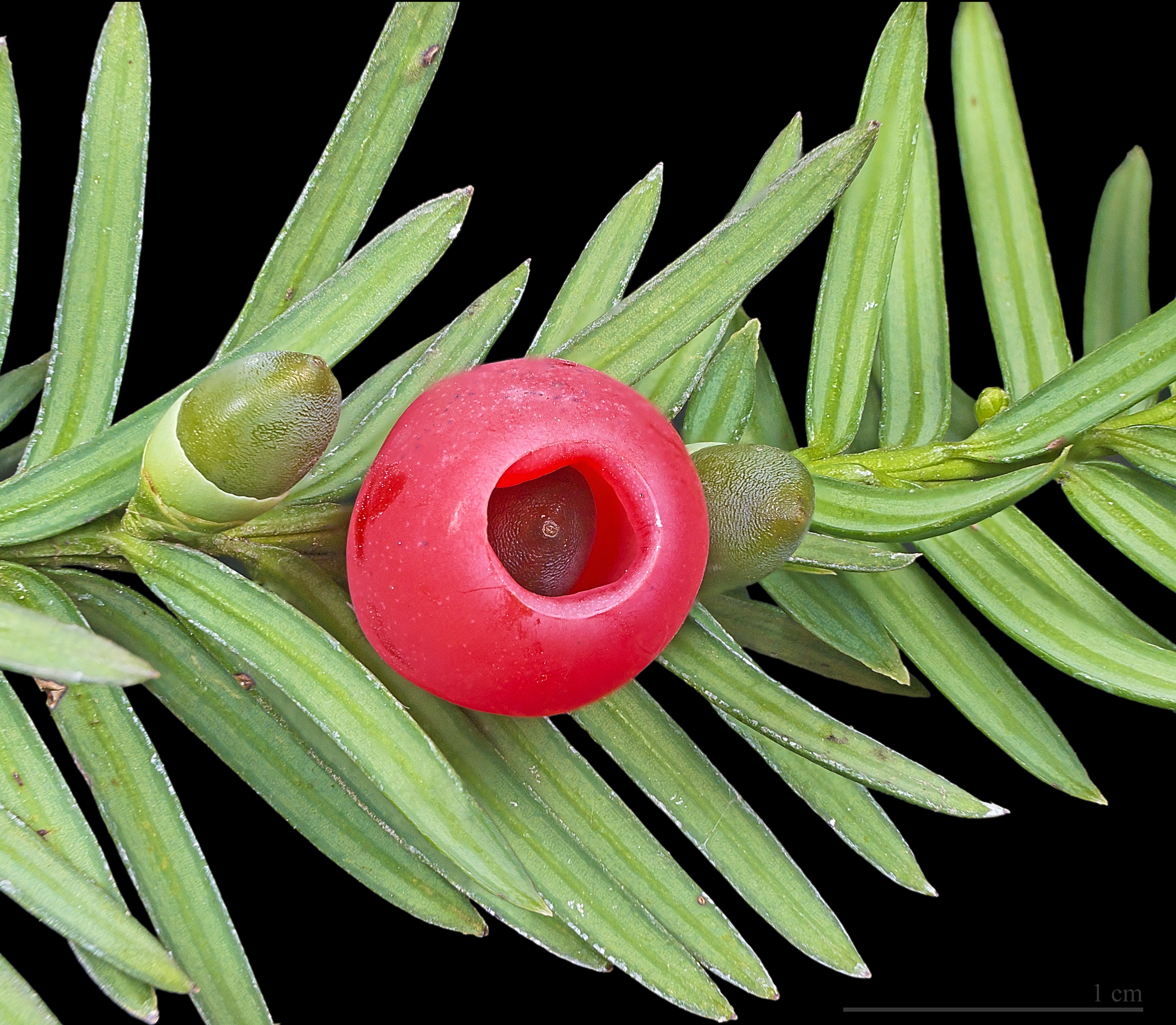
"Yewberry", more accurately the aril of the European yew

Non-restrictive supplements such as the following adjective phrase have been argued to be grammatical structures that produce conventional implicatures:

Yewberry jelly, toxic in the extreme, will give you an awful stomach ache.

The implicature here is that yewberry jelly is toxic in the extreme. Other such constructions are non-restrictive appositives, relative clauses and as-parentheticals:

Ravel, as a Frenchman, nevertheless wrote Spanish-style music.

=== Criticism ===
Because of the mentioned differences to conversational (and relevance theoretical) implicatures, it has been argued that "conventional implicatures" are not implicatures at all but rather secondary propositions or entailments of an utterance. Under this view, the sentence about Donovan would have the primary proposition "Donovan is poor and happy" and the secondary proposition "There is a contrast between poverty and happiness". The sentence about yewberry jelly contains the two propositions "Yewberry jelly will give you an awful stomachache" and "Yewberry jelly is toxic in the extreme".

Other analyses of but and similar words have been proposed. Rieber takes above sentence to mean "Donovan is poor and (I suggest this contrasts) happy" and calls it a tacit (i.e. silent, implied) performative. Blakemore claims that but does not convey a proposition, and does not work by encoding a concept at all, but by constraining the addressee's interpretation procedure. In this example, but indicates that "Donovan is happy" is relevant specifically as a denial of an expectation created by "Donovan is poor", and rules out the possibility that it is relevant in any other way. This expectation must be on the lines of "Poor people are unhappy". Blakemore's idea that not only concepts but also procedures can be encoded in language has been taken up by many other researchers.

== See also ==
- Entailment, or implication, in logic
- Free choice inference
- Indirect speech act
- Presupposition

== General and cited references ==
- Bach, Kent (1999). "The Myth of Conventional Implicature". Linguistics and Philosophy. 22 (4): 327–366. doi:10.1023/A:1005466020243. S2CID 17992433.
- Bach, Kent (2006). "The top 10 misconceptions about implicature". In Birner, Betty J.; Ward, Gregory L. (eds.). Drawing the Boundaries of Meaning: Neo-Gricean Studies in Pragmatics and Semantics in Honor of Laurence R. Horn. John Benjamins Publishing. pp. 21–30. ISBN 90-272-3090-0.
- Birner, Betty (2012). Introduction to Pragmatics. Wiley-Blackwell. ISBN 978-1405175838.
- Blackburn, Simon (1996). The Oxford Dictionary of Philosophy. Oxford University Press. Implicature. ISBN 978-0198735304.
- Blakemore, Diane (1989). "Denial and contrast: A relevance theoretic analysis of but". Linguistics and Philosophy. 12: 15–37. doi:10.1007/BF00627397. S2CID 62602518.
- Blakemore, Diane (2000). "Indicators and procedures: nevertheless and but" (PDF). Journal of Linguistics. 36 (3): 463–486. doi:10.1017/S0022226700008355. S2CID 146526926.
- Blome-Tillmann, Michael (2013). "Conversational Implicatures (and How to Spot Them)" (PDF). Philosophy Compass. 8 (2): 170–185. doi:10.1111/phc3.12003. S2CID 15434260. Archived from the original (PDF) on 2018-12-16.
- Carston, Robyn (1988). "Implicature, Explicature, and Truth-Theoretic Semantics". In Kempson, Ruth (ed.). Mental Representations: The Interface between Language and Reality. Cambridge University Press. pp. 155–182. ISBN 978-0-521-34251-3.
- Carston, Robyn (1998). "Informativeness, Relevance and Scalar Implicature". Relevance Theory: Applications and Implications (PDF). John Benjamins. ISBN 978-1556193309.
- Carston, Robyn (2002). Thoughts and Utterances: The Pragmatics of Explicit Communication. Wiley-Blackwell. ISBN 978-0631214885.
- Cole, Peter; Morgan, Jerry L., eds. (1975). Syntax and Semantics, 3: Speech Acts. Academic Press. ISBN 978-0-12-785424-3.
- Davis, Wayne (2019). "Implicature". In Zalta, Edward N. (ed.). The Stanford Encyclopedia of Philosophy. Metaphysics Research Lab, Stanford University.
- Grice, H. P. (1975), Logic and conversation (PDF). Cole & Morgan (1975). Reprinted in Grice (1989:22–40). Page numbers refer to the reprint.
- Grice, H. P., ed. (1989). Studies in the Way of Words. Harvard University Press. ISBN 978-0-674-85270-9.
- Holtgraves, Thomas; Kraus, Brian (2018). "Processing scalar implicatures in conversational contexts: An ERP study". Journal of Neurolinguistics. 46: 93–108. doi:10.1016/j.jneuroling.2017.12.008. S2CID 53156540.
- Horn, Laurence R. (1989). A Natural History of Negation. University of Chicago Press. ISBN 978-1575863368.
- Horn, Laurence R. (2004). "Implicature". In Horn, Laurence R.; Ward, Gregory (eds.). The Handbook of Pragmatics. Wiley-Blackwell. pp. 2–28. doi:10.1002/9780470756959.ch1. ISBN 978-0631225478.
- Kordić, Snježana (1991). "Konverzacijske implikature" [Conversational implicatures] (PDF). Suvremena Lingvistika (in Serbo-Croatian). 17 (31–32). Zagreb: 87–96. ISSN 0586-0296. OCLC 440780341. SSRN 3442421. CROSBI 446883. ZDB-ID 429609-6. Archived from the original (PDF) on 2 September 2012.
- Levinson, Stephen (1983). Pragmatics. Cambridge University Press. ISBN 978-0521294140.
- Levinson, Stephen (1987). "Minimization and conversational inference". In Verschueren, Jef; Bertuccelli-Papi, Marcella (eds.). The Pragmatic Perspective. John Benjamins. pp. 61–129. ISBN 978-1556190117.
- Levinson, Stephen (1989). "A review of Relevance". Journal of Linguistics. 25 (2): 455–472. doi:10.1017/S0022226700014183. S2CID 145367406.
- Levinson, Stephen (2000). Presumptive Meanings: The Theory of Generalized Conversational Implicature. MIT Press. ISBN 978-0262621304.
- Potts, Christopher (2005). "Conventional implicatures, a distinguished class of meanings" (PDF). The Oxford Handbook of Linguistic Interfaces. Oxford University Press.
- Sperber, Dan; Wilson, Deirdre (1995). Relevance: Communication and Cognition. Wiley-Blackwell. ISBN 978-0631198789.
- Wilson, Deirdre; Sperber, Dan (1981). "On Grice's Theory of Conversation". In Werth, Paul (ed.). Conversation and Discourse. Croom Helm. pp. 155–178. ISBN 9780709927174.
- Wilson, Deirdre; Sperber, Dan (2002). "Relevance Theory" (PDF). UCL Psychology and Language Sciences.
