= R-principle =

Concept in semantics and pragmatics

In the Neo-Gricean approach to semantics and pragmatics advanced by Yale linguist Laurence Horn, the R-principle ("R" for "Relation") is a reformulation of Paul Grice's maxim of relation (see Gricean maxims) combining with the second sub-maxim of quantity and the third and fourth sub-maxims of manner. The R-principle states: "Say no more than you must (given Q)." As such it interacts with the Q-principle, which states: "Say as much as you can (given R)."

According to the R-principle, there is no reason to make a stronger statement (say more) if the extra information can be contributed by implicature. For instance, the inference from "He broke a finger" to "He broke a finger of his own" is an R-based inference, i.e. deriving from the R-principle, since the economy of expression implies that a more informative statement was not needed.
