= Q-principle =

Concept in semantics and pragmatics

In the Neo-Gricean approach to semantics and pragmatics championed by Yale linguist Laurence Horn, the Q-principle ("Q" for "Quantity") is a reformulation of Paul Grice's maxim of quantity (see Gricean maxims) combined with the first two sub-maxims of manner. The Q-principle states: "Say as much as you can (given R)." As such it interacts with the R-principle, which states: "Say no more than you must (given Q)."

The Q-principle leads to the implicature (or narrowing) that if the speaker did not make a stronger statement (or say more), then its denial is (implied to be) true. For instance, the inference from "He entered a house" to "He did not enter his own house" is Q-based inference, i.e. deriving from the Q-principle.
