= Explicature =

Explicature is a technical term in pragmatics, the branch of linguistics that concerns the meaning given to an utterance by its context. The explicatures of a sentence are what is explicitly said, often supplemented with contextual information. They contrast with implicatures, the information that the speaker conveys without actually stating it.

The truth value of a sentence is determined using its explicature. For example:

Imagine Jim and Raoul are driving across America from New York City to Seattle, Washington. Raoul is driving, and Jim falls asleep. When Jim wakes up, he asks Raoul, "Where are we?" Raoul replies, "We aren't there yet, but we've passed Chicago."

If Jim and Raoul's car is in fact five minutes outside Seattle and Raoul knows this, he may be accused of lying, since "We aren't there yet, but we've passed Chicago" in that context has the implicature "We are not too far past Chicago and still not near Seattle." Technically, however, Raoul's statement was true, because the explicature — at the time of utterance, Jim and Raoul had passed Chicago and were not yet there (supplement: in Seattle) — was true.

== Definition ==
Explicature was introduced by Sperber and Wilson as a concept in relevance theory. Carston gives a formal definition in accord with their reasoning:

[An explicature is an] ostensively communicated assumption that is inferentially developed from one of the incomplete conceptual representations (logical forms) encoded by the utterance.

Thus, only meanings of an utterance that are communicated can be explicatures. Information that can be inferred, but was not intended to be inferred by the communicator, is neither an explicature nor an implicature. Conversely, something that is communicated but not believed by the addressee is an explicature, as the responsibility for explicatures lies with the communicator.

== Developing explicatures ==
The definition also implies that the logical form (intuitively, the literal meaning) of an utterance is incomplete. In order to turn it into a complete proposition that is either true or false, enough context must be known to be able to infer additional information: to

- assign referents to indexical expressions (such as proper names and pronouns),
- disambiguate ambiguous expressions,
- "enrich" logical forms containing words and grammatical structures that are semantically or grammatically incomplete (e.g. genitive constructions, the degree adverb "too", or ellipses).

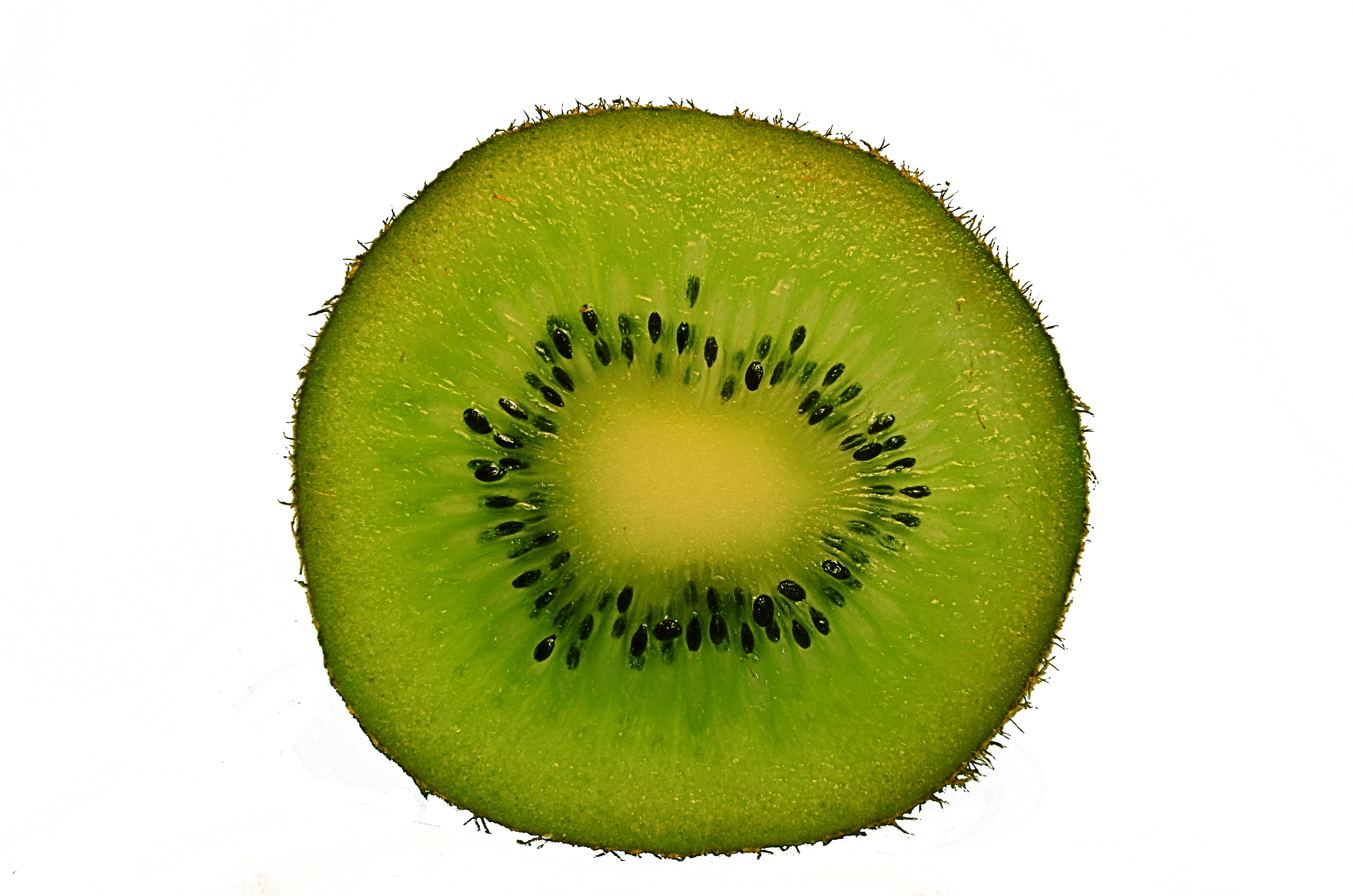
Kiwifruit

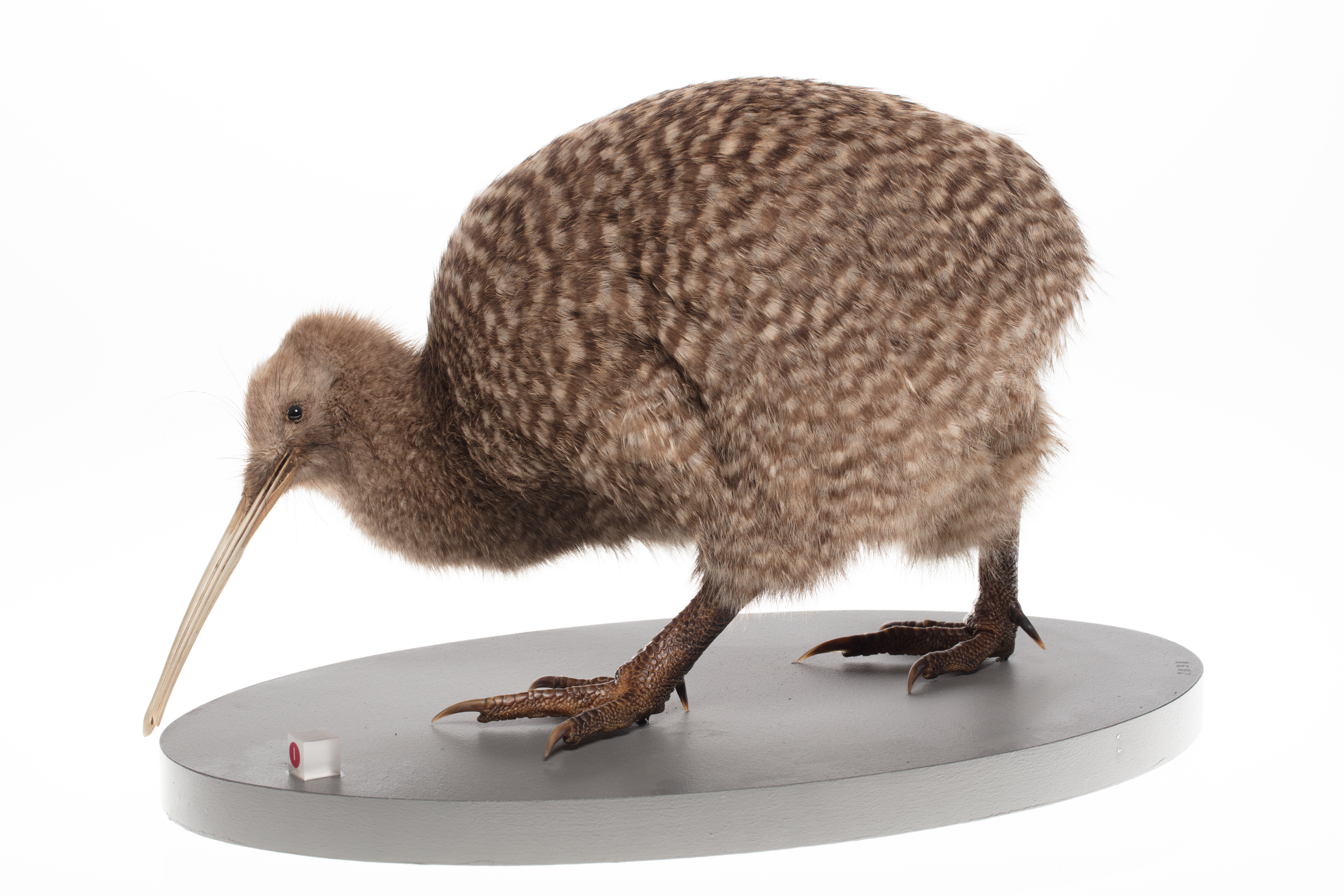
Great spotted kiwi

Disambiguating ambiguous expressions: Which kiwis does Peter refer to?

For example, if Peter says "Susan told me that her kiwis were too sour", the hearer has to determine which Susan he is referring to, whether "her" refers to Susan, whether "kiwis" means the fruit or the birds, in what relation the kiwis stand to her, and by what standard they were too sour. The hearer bases his decisions on the concept of relevance, which basically says that the resulting interpretation should have many effects on his knowledge and beliefs at a low cost for his speech processing system. So, depending on the context, the first explicature of the utterance might be one of the following:

(1a) Peter has said that Susan told him that the kiwifruit she, Susan, ate were too sour for her taste.
(1b) Peter has said that Susan told him that the kiwifruit she, Susan, grew were too sour for the judges at the fruit grower’s contest.

Let us assume it follows from context that (1a) is the correct explicature. Now if Peter is speaking literally (as opposed to, say, ironically), the utterance also communicates

(2) Peter believes that Susan told him that the kiwifruit she ate were too sour for her taste.

If Peter has reason to think that his utterance will convince the hearer, it further communicates

(3) Susan told Peter that the kiwifruit she ate were too sour for her taste.

This is called the basic explicature of the utterance, while (1a), (1b) and (2) are higher-level explicatures.

Explicature (2) communicates a propositional attitude of the speaker, namely that he believes the proposition expressed by the utterance. Additional attitudes can be expressed by further higher-level explicatures, for example

(4a) Peter is annoyed that Susan told him that the kiwifruit she ate were too sour for her taste.
(4b) Peter is bewildered that Susan told him that the kiwifruit she ate were too sour for her taste.

or, if the statement is ironic,

(5) It is ridiculous to say that Susan told Peter that the kiwifruit she ate were too sour for her taste.

The speaker can give the addressee various linguistic cues to indicate propositional attitudes, such as grammatical mood, and paralinguistic cues, such as tone of voice. Often such cues do not determine the attitude, and the addressee again has to take the context into account.

Regarding grammatical mood, the first higher-level explicature of an imperative utterance is "The speaker is telling the hearer to …". Depending on other cues and context, further explicatures could be "The speaker is ordering the hearer to …", "It is moderately desirable to the speaker that …", or "It would be desirable to the hearer that …", as in this example:

(6) A: Could you tell me the way to the station?

B: Turn right at the traffic lights and keep straight on. (explicature: It would be desirable to A to turn right at the traffic lights and keep straight on.)

The first higher-level explicature of a question is "The speaker is asking whether/what/who …". Neither imperatives nor questions have a basic explicature in the above sense.

Inferences that aren't logically compelling are defeasible: they can be "defeated" (cancelled) by explicit information without sounding self-contradictory. Thus Peter could cancel much of the above by continuing the original sentence with "Susan made the birds Chinese style, sweet-sour, but used way too much lime juice for my taste."

== Disputed cases ==
=== Expansion ===
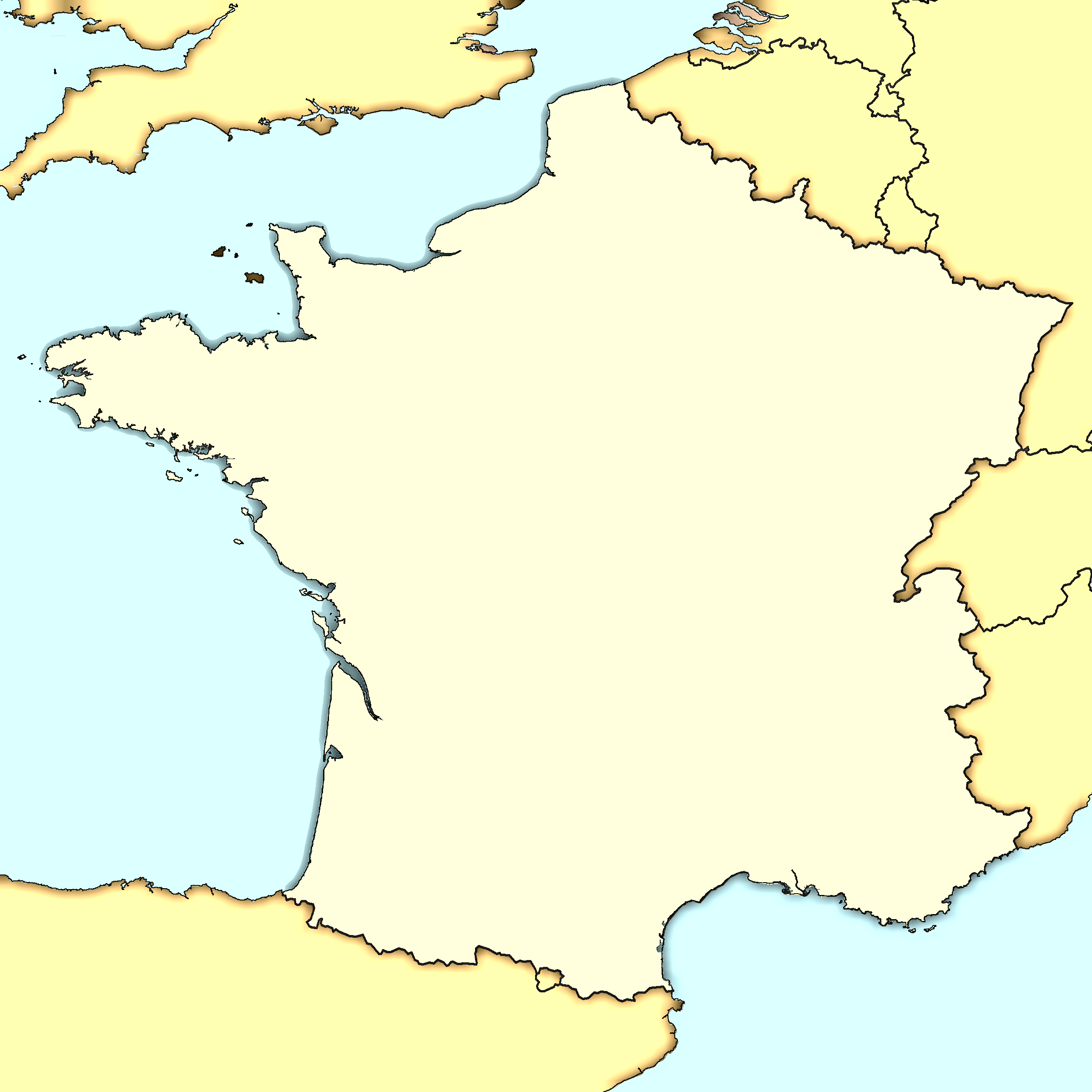
Is France hexagonal?

Often an utterance that already is a complete proposition needs further expansion to arrive at the proposition the communicator intended to convey. This can involve

- adding missing constituents (This is a difficult task → for me / for a schoolchild / for the scientific community),
- specifying the scope of certain elements such as negators (Everyone isn't hungry → Not everyone is hungry or No one is hungry),
- strengthening of expressions (This will take time → This will take more time than you might expect; I have had breakfast → I have had breakfast today; He drank a bottle of vodka and fell into a stupor → He drank a bottle of vodka and consequently fell into a stupor; Mr Prescott is busy → Mr Prescott is so busy that he cannot see you),
- weakening of expressions (France is hexagonal → France is approximately hexagonal; The room was silent → The room was nearly silent)

There is little consensus which of these, if any, is part of what is explicitly said, i.e. which are explicatures. Carston has argued that an utterance's implicatures cannot entail any of its explicatures; hence, the above should be explicatures. Another test for explicatures is that they can be embedded in negations and if clauses, which is supposedly impossible for implicatures. However, neither of these tests is generally accepted.

=== Impliciture ===
Kent Bach has argued against viewing enrichment as a form of explicature. He has coined the term impliciture to refer to completions of the logical form to a proposition, minus assignment of referents and disambiguation, and also to expansions in the above sense. This is to distinguish what is explicitly said in a narrow sense, i.e. the literal meaning, from what goes beyond the linguistic material actually present in the sentence.

=== Metaphor and other figures of speech ===
Relevance theory originally described loose talk, hyperbole, metaphor, and other figures of speech as conveying information solely via implicatures. The argument goes that a metaphorical utterance such as "Your room is a pigsty" would have the basic explicature "Your room is an enclosure where pigs are kept", but that cannot be an explicature at all because it is certainly not communicated. What is actually communicated, approximately "Your room is very filthy and untidy", must therefore be an implicature.

Carston noted that the mentioned embedding tests classify metaphors and other figures of speech as explicatures, not implicatures. To resolve this issue, she has proposed that the meaning of words and phrases is adapted depending on the circumstances of an utterance. Thus, "pigsty" acquires the sense "a very filthy and untidy place", so that the meaning of the utterance can be accommodated by an explicature.

== Bibliography ==
- Bach, Kent (1994). "Conversational Impliciture". Mind and Language. 9 (2): 124–62. doi:10.1111/j.1468-0017.1994.tb00220.x.
- Carston, Robyn (1988). "Implicature, Explicature, and Truth-Theoretic Semantics". In Kempson, Ruth (ed.). Mental Representations: The Interface between Language and Reality. Cambridge University Press.
- Carston, Robyn (2002). Thoughts and Utterances: The Pragmatics of Explicit Communication. Wiley-Blackwell. ISBN 978-0631214885.
- Sperber, Dan; Wilson, Deirdre (1995). Relevance: Communication and Cognition. Wiley-Blackwell. ISBN 978-0631198789.
- Wilson, Deirdre; Sperber, Dan (2002). "Relevance Theory" (PDF). UCL Psychology and Language Sciences.
