= Theodore Zeldin =

British historian and academic (1933–2026)

Theodore Zeldin CBE FBA FRSL
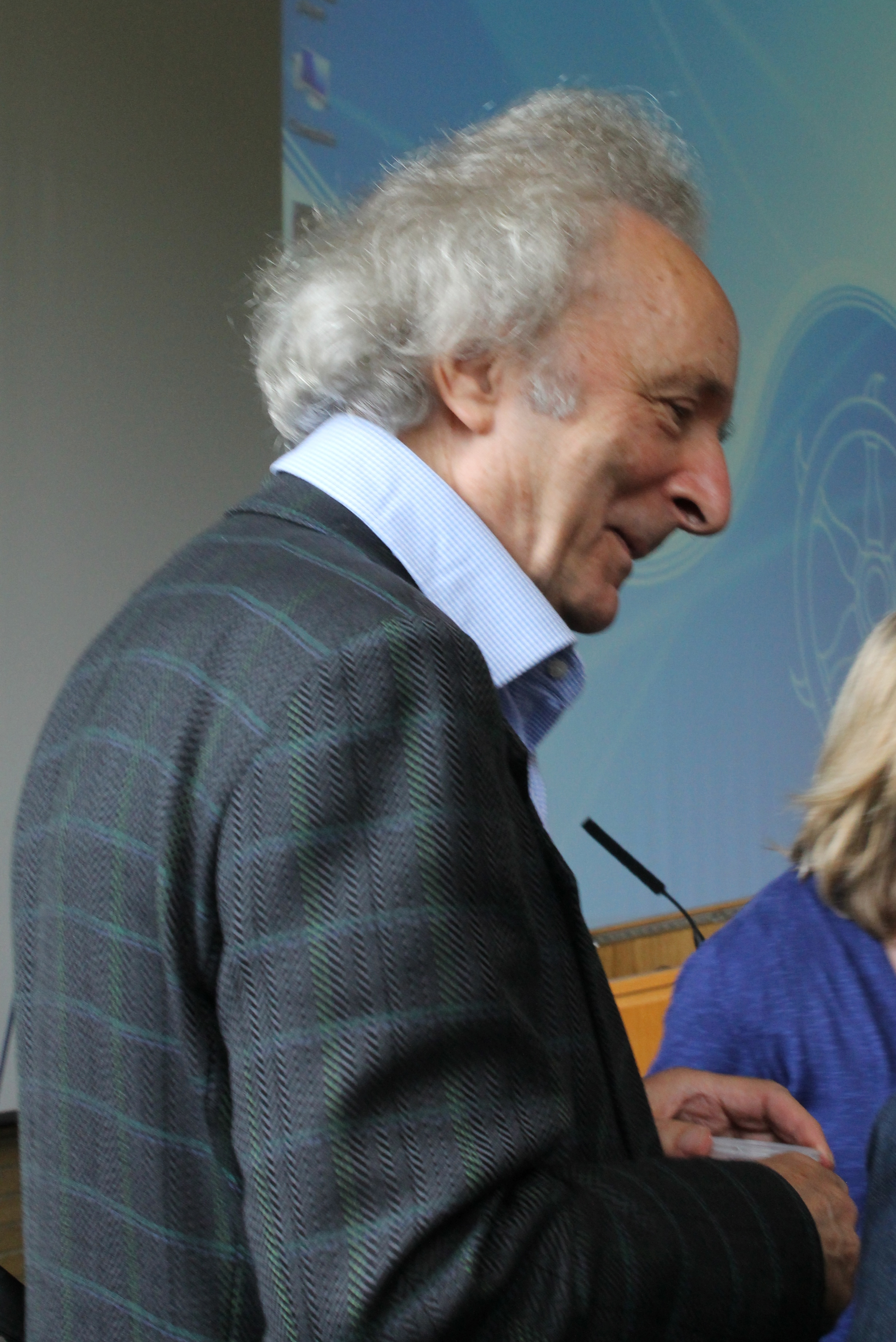
- Zeldin in 2012
- Born: 22 August 1933; Mount Carmel, Mandatory Palestine
- Died: 13 November 2026 (aged 93)
- Spouse: Deirdre Wilson (m. 1975)
- Awards: Wolfson History Prize

Academic background
- Education: English School Heliopolis; Aylesbury Grammar School; Birkbeck, University of London; Christ Church, Oxford; St Antony's College, Oxford
- Thesis: The parliamentarians of the Second Empire in France (1957)

Academic work
- Discipline: History
- Sub-discipline: Political history; France in the long nineteenth century
- Institutions: St Antony's College, Oxford; Green Templeton College, Oxford
- Doctoral students: Robert Gildea

Theodore Zeldin CBE FBA FRSL (22 August 1933 – 13 November 2026) was a British historian and academic who was an Associate Fellow of Green Templeton College, Oxford. He was the author of A History of French Passions, a quotidian history of the French people, as well as An Intimate History of Humanity. He was also a Fellow of St Antony's College, Oxford, having previously been its dean for 13 years, and a Fellow of the British Academy and the Royal Society of Literature.

== Life and career ==
Theodore Zeldin was born on Mount Carmel in British Mandate-Palestine on 22 August 1933, the son of Russian-Jewish parents who later chose to become naturalised British subjects. His father was a civil engineer, an expert in bridge-building, a colonel in the Russian Czarist Army, and a socialist who rejected the Bolsheviks. Zeldin's mother, the daughter of an industrialist, was a dentist who completed her training in Vienna. Escaping from the Russian Civil War, Zeldin's parents emigrated to Palestine, where his father worked for the British Colonial Service building railways. He was disappointed by the failure of the movement for Arab-Jewish solidarity, which he favoured together with other scientists and intellectuals, and of which the railwaymen's trade union was a vocal advocate.

He was educated at the English School Heliopolis (a coeducational boarding school) and at Aylesbury Grammar School. He graduated from Birkbeck, University of London, at the age of 17, having studied philosophy, history, and Latin, and then from Christ Church, Oxford, studying modern history. He received Firsts from both, followed by a doctorate from the newly established St Antony's College in Oxford. He was a Fellow of the college from 1957 and was its dean for thirteen years, playing a lead role in developing it as the university's centre for international studies. As an Associate Fellow of Green-Templeton College, Oxford, he was active in its Future of Work project.

In 1995, Zeldin was elected a Fellow of the British Academy (FBA). He was also a Fellow of the Royal Society of Literature (FRSL), and was a member of the European Academy. He was appointed a Commander of the Order of the British Empire (CBE) in the 2001 Birthday Honours for services to literature and Anglo-French relations, and was also appointed a Commander of the Légion d'Honneur and a Commander of the Order of Arts and Letters of France. Zeldin also held the Wolfson Prize, Britain's top award for history.

He married Deirdre Wilson, the co-inventor of relevance theory, in 1975; they lived in an Art Deco house outside Oxford. His hobbies were "gardening, painting and mending things".

Zeldin died on 13 November 2026, aged 93.

== Publications ==
- The Political System of Napoleon III (1958)
- Edited (with Anne Troisier de Diaz) Émile Ollivier, Journal: 1846-1863 (1961)
- Émile Ollivier and the Liberal Empire of Napoleon III (1963)
- Conflicts in French Society: Anticlericalism, Education and Morals in the Nineteenth Century: Essays (1970)
- France, 1848-1945: Volume I - Ambition, Love and Politics (1973), Volume II - Intellect, Taste and Anxiety (1977) (Oxford History of Modern Europe series). Rearranged and reissued with additional material as:
- History of French Passions: vol 1: Ambition and Love; vol 2: Intellect and Pride; vol 3: Taste and Corruption; vol 4: Politics and Anger; vol 5: Anxiety and Hypocrisy (1979-81)
- The French (1982)
- Foreword to Jeremy Jennings, Georges Sorel: The Character and Development of His Thought (1985)
- Introduction to Le tunnel sous la Manche: chronique d'une passion franco-anglaise (1987)
- Happiness (novel) (1988)
- An Intimate History of Humanity (1994)
- Conversation (2000)
- Guide to an Unknown City (2004)
- Guide to an Unknown University (2006)
- Gary Hill & Gerry Judah (with Jenny Blyth) (2007)
- The Hidden Pleasures of Life: A New Way of Remembering the Past and Imagining the Future (2015)
