= Explicate =

Explicate can refer to:

- Explication, in analytic philosophy and literary theory, the "unfolding" and "making clear" the meaning of things
- Explicature, what is explicitly said with an utterance, often supplemented with contextual information
- Explicate order, a concept in quantum theory
