= Stephen Neale =

British philosopher (born 1958)

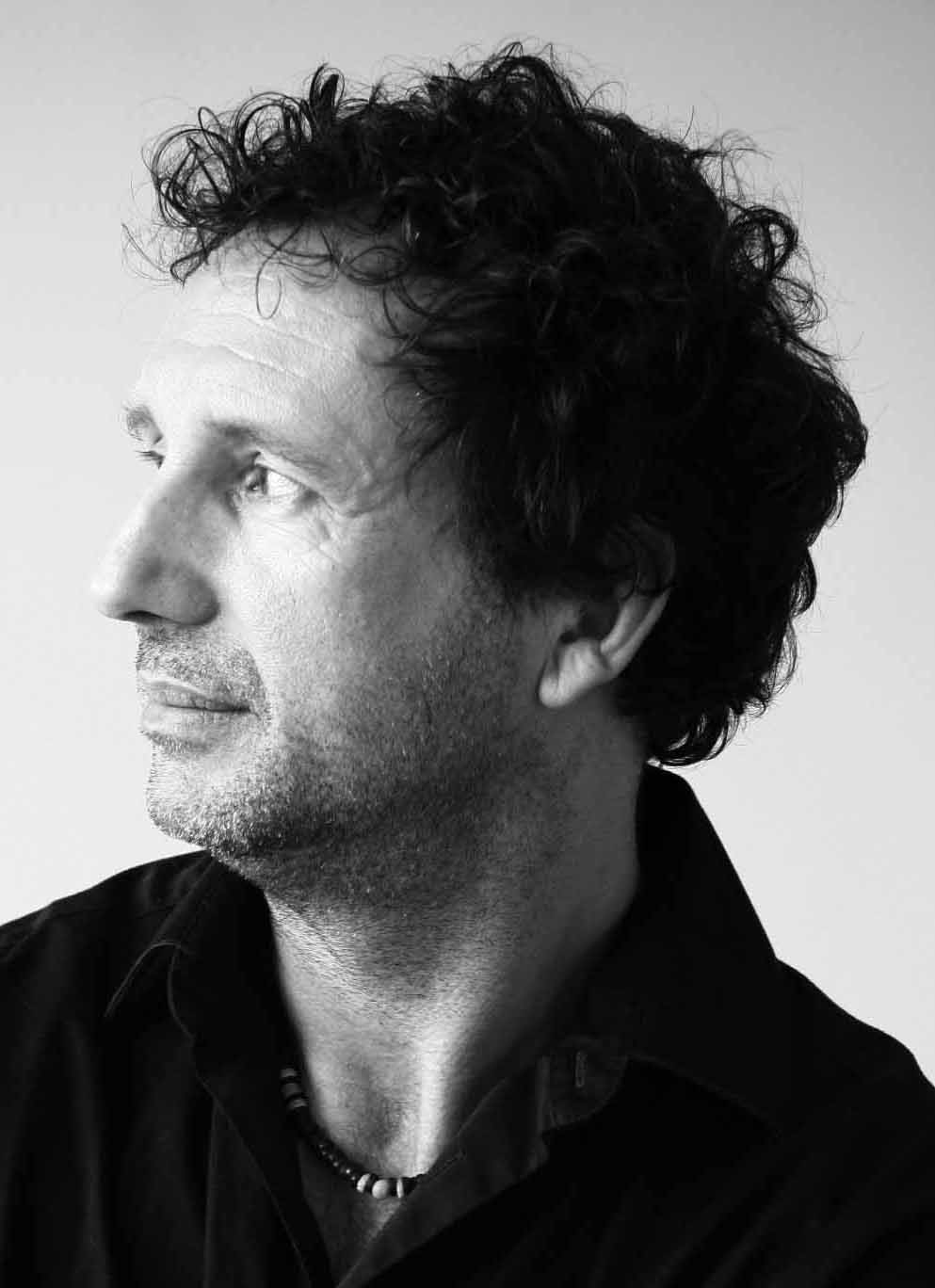
- Neale in 2007
- Born: 9 January 1958 (age 68); England

Education
- Education: University College London (BA); Stanford University (PhD)

Philosophical work
- Era: Contemporary philosophy
- Region: Western philosophy
- School: Analytic philosophy
- Main interests: Philosophy of language

Stephen Roy Albert Neale (born 9 January 1958) is a British philosopher and specialist in the philosophy of language who has written extensively about meaning, information, interpretation, and communication, and more generally about issues at the intersection of philosophy and linguistics. Neale is a Distinguished Professor of Philosophy and Linguistics and holder of the John H. Kornblith Family Chair in the Philosophy of Science and Values at the Graduate Center, City University of New York (CUNY).

== Education and career ==
Neale completed his BA in linguistics at University College London working with linguist Deirdre Wilson. He completed his PhD in Philosophy at Stanford University with philosopher John Perry as his dissertation advisor.

Prior to joining the CUNY faculty, Neale held positions at Princeton University, University of California, Berkeley, and Rutgers University.

Neale's doctoral students include Pierre Baumann (University of Puerto Rico), Herman Cappelen (University of Oslo), Josh Dever (University of Texas, Austin), Eli Dresner (Tel Aviv University), Brian Robinson (Texas A&M University–Kingsville), Daniel Harris (CUNY), Angel Pinillos (Arizona State University), and Elmar Unnsteinsson (University College Dublin).

== Philosophical work ==
Neale's writings are primarily in the philosophy of language. His research intersects with generative linguistics, the philosophy of mind, cognitive science, metaphysics, philosophical logic, the philosophy of law and the philosophy of archaeology.

Philosophical problems about interpretation, context, information content, structure, and representation form the nexus of this work. Neale is an intentionalist and a pragmatist about the interpretation of speech and writing, and to this extent his work is rooted in the Gricean tradition. He has vigorously defended an intention-based theory of meaning, and a general approach to meaning and interpretation he calls "linguistic pragmatism" that can be tailored to legal contexts. He has also defended and extended Russell's Theory of Descriptions and descriptive theories of anaphora. According to Neale traditional accounts of interpretation are marred by failures that can be eradicated by (1) engaging correctly with the epistemic asymmetry of the situations in which producers and consumers of language find themselves; (2) distinguishing adequately the metaphysical question of what determines what a speaker (or writer or signer) means on a given occasion from the epistemological question of how that particular meaning is identified; (3) appreciating the severity of constraints on the formation of linguistic intentions; (4) appreciating pervasive forms of underdetermination (such as those examined by pragmatists and relevance theorists); (5) failures to recognise that genuine indeterminacy of the sort associated with what speakers (and writers) "imply" frequently applies to what is "said" too; (6) abandoning reliance on formal notions of context deriving from indexical logics, (7) scrutinising transcendent notions of "what is said", "what is implied" and "what is referred to"; and (8) correcting the role traditional compositional semantics plays in explanations of how humans use language to represent the world and communicate.

Neale also wrote an influential defense of Saul Kripke in the Times Literary Supplement against charges that Kripke's new theory of reference had plagiarized work by Ruth Barcan Marcus.

== Publications ==
=== Books ===
- Descriptions MIT Press, 1993. (Originally published 1990.) ISBN 0-262-64031-7
- Facing Facts Oxford University Press, 2002. (Originally published 2001.) ISBN 0-19-924715-3

=== Edited volume ===
- Mind. Special issue commemorating 100th anniversary of Russell's "On Denoting" Oxford University Press, 2005.

=== Selected articles ===
- Determinations of Meaning. In Oxford Studies in the Philosophy of Language Vol 2. E. Lepore and D. Sosa (eds.) Oxford: Oxford University Press, 2021
- How Demonstratives and Indexicals Really Work. (with S. Schiffer) In The Routledge Handbook on Linguistic Reference S. Biggs and H. Geirsson (eds.), Routledge 2021, pp. 439–448.
- Silent Reference. In Meanings and Other Things: Essays in Honor of Stephen Schiffer. G. Ostertag, (ed.) Oxford University Press, 2016, pp. 229–344.
- Term limits Revisited Philosophical Perspectives 22, 1 (2008), pp. 89–124.
- On Location. In Situating Semantics: Essays in Honour of John Perry. MIT Press 2007, pp. 251–393.
- Pragmatism and Binding. In Semantics versus Pragmatics. Oxford University Press, 2005, pp. 165–286.
- A Century Later. In Mind 114, 2005, pp. 809–871.
- This, That, and the Other. In Descriptions and Beyond. Oxford University Press, 2004, pp. 68–182.
- No Plagiarism Here! Times Literary Supplement. 9 February 2001, pp. 12–13.
- Meaning, Truth, Ontology. In Interpreting Davidson. Stanford: CSLI, (2001) pp. 155–197.
- On Representing". In The Library of Living Philosophers: Donald Davidson. L. E. Hahn (ed.), Illinois: Open Court, (1999) pp. 656–669.
- Coloring and Composition. In Philosophy and Linguistics Boulder: Westview Press, 1999, pp. 35–82.
- Context and Communication. In Readings in the Philosophy of Language. Cambridge: MIT Press (1997), pp. 415–474.
- Logical Form and LF. In Noam Chomsky: Critical Assessments Routledge, 1993, pp. 788–838.
- Term limits. Philosophical Perspectives 7, 1993, pp. 89–124.
- Paul Grice and the Philosophy of Language. Linguistics and Philosophy 15, 5, 1992, pp. 509–59.
- Descriptive Pronouns and Donkey Anaphora. Journal of Philosophy 87, 3, 1990, pp. 113–150.
- Meaning, Grammar, and Indeterminacy. Dialectica 41, 4, 1987, pp. 301–19.
