= Epidemiology of representations =

Theory of culture

Epidemiology of representations, or cultural epidemiology, is a theory for explaining cultural phenomena by examining how mental representations get distributed within a population. The theory uses medical epidemiology as its chief analogy, because "...macro-phenomena such as endemic and epidemic diseases are unpacked in terms of patterns of micro-phenomena of individual pathology and inter-individual transmission". Representations transfer via so-called "cognitive causal chains" (cf. Table 1); these representations constitute a cultural phenomenon by achieving stability of public production and mental representation within the existing ecology and psychology of a populace, the latter including properties of the human mind. Cultural epidemiologists have emphasized the significance of evolved properties, such as the existence of naïve theories, domain-specific abilities and principles of relevance.

The theory has been formulated mainly by the French social and cognitive scientist Dan Sperber for the study of society and culture, by taking into account evidence from anthropology and cognitive science.

== Theory of cognitive causal chains ==
=== Cognitive causal chains ===
A cognitive causal chain (CCC) links a mental representation (e.g. satisfaction, justification, truth-value or similarity of content) with individual behaviors and mental processes (e.g. perception, inference, remembering, and the carrying out of an intention). More generally, it links something that can be perceived with the evolved and domain-specific process that makes it perceivable; for example, a visual perception of a stimulus that leads to a mental representation of the stimulus that triggered it.

Here is an example of a CCC:

On October 31, at 7:30 p.m., Mrs. Jones's doorbell rings. Mrs. Jones hears the doorbell, and assumes that there is somebody at the door. She remembers it is Halloween: she enjoyed receiving treats as a child, and now, as an adult, she enjoys giving them. She guesses that there must be children at the door ready to trick-or-treat, and that, if she opens, she will be able to give them the candies she has bought for the occasion. Mrs. Jones decides to open the door, and does so.

=== Social cognitive causal chains (SCCCs) ===
Social cognitive causal chains (SCCCs) are inter-individual CCCs. A SCCC always implies individual CCCs but a CCC just leads to a SCCC if it involves an inter-individual act of communication or other effective forms of non-communicative interaction.

Here is an example of a SCCC involving an act of communication (ringing a doorbell):

Billy and Julia are following the Halloween practice of going from door to door in the street, hoping to be given candies. When they reach Mrs. Jones's door, Billy rings the bell with the intention of letting the house owner know that someone is at the door, and of making her open the door ... [plug in Mrs. Jones's story as told above] ... Mrs. Jones opens the door. Billy and Julia shout 'trick or treats!' Mrs. Jones gives them candies.

=== Cultural cognitive causal chains ===
Human interaction involves many cases of ad-hoc cultural cognitive causal chains (SCCCs) that do not follow a significant long-term pattern over many people. Yet, other SCCCs can be long-lasting, systematical, and across a large population; for example, the Halloween custom mentioned above. The latter kinds of SCCCs arguably stabilize mental representations intra- and inter-individually to an extent that they can be considered as cultural if their behavior (practices and resulting artifacts) significantly represent their population. A CCCC therefore always implies SCCCs but a SCCC just leads to a CCCC if it involves one or more SCCCs that significantly indicate mental representations or public productions.

Cognitive causal chain (CCC)

A causal chain where each causal link instantiates a semantic relationship

Social cognitive causal chain (SCCC)

A CCC that extends over several individuals

Cultural cognitive causal chain (CCCC)

A social CCC that stabilizes mental representations and public productions in a population and its environment

Table 1: Overview of cognitive causal chains constituting the epidemiology of representations (from).

== Cultural stability, diversity, and massive modularity ==
Epidemiology of representations suggests that both cultural diversity and stability (macro-level) together can be explained by the massive modularity of the human brain and mind (micro-level) and social cognitive causal chains. This means that the manifold of human cultural behavior is ultimately explained by the manifold of domain-specific human cognitive abilities (mental representations) and respective SCCC. This claim would have broad impact, when applicable. It is discussed in further detail by Sperber and Hirschfeld for the cases of folkbiology, folksociology, and supernaturalism. Here is an example: Think about a human cognitive sub-system that must have been very important for human cognitive evolution (i.e. a module with an innate basis); like the ability that allows humans to recognize and interpret visual patterns as faces. One can call this cognitive sub-system the human "face recognition module". It was most likely built by evolution to recognize and interpret animal faces via decoding facial expressions produced by a complex system of facial muscles. Humans with certain types of brain damage lose this ability (cf. prosopagnosia, social-emotional agnosia). Yet, the module also processes visual input that is relatively similar to patterns of natural faces. Such can be cultural artifacts like portraits, caricatures, masks, and made-up faces.

According to the epidemiology of representation the effectiveness (defined by its relevance) of a public production depends on the extent to which it exploits a human cognitive module. Cultural artifacts "...rely on and exploit a natural disposition. Often, they exaggerate crucial features, as in caricature or in make up, and constitute what ethologists call 'superstimuli.'" Two domains of cognitive modules can therefore be distinguished: the proper, natural domain and the actual, cultural domain. In the above example, the first relates to natural faces, the second to portraits, caricatures, masks, and made-up faces. Those categories can intersect, like shown in Figure 2. Since made-up faces literally overlap the proper with the actual domain, they are the most effective and relevant public product in the example. Therefore, they lead to the most stable CCCC, if they significantly reflect the population's behavior. The other stimuli in the cultural domain will theoretically be as efficient and stable depending on the extent that they exploit the "face perception module".

Figure 2: A hypothetical Venn diagram of the cognitive domains of the "human face module".

== Inter-individual stability of mental representations ==
Epidemiology of representations states that there must be a SCCC, the mechanism inter-linking a mental representation with an individual behavior, for the latter and explains its stability over time and space by the relevance theoretical status of the underlying behavior. There are three minimal conditions for an inter-individual replication that ensures transfer stability.

For b to be an actual replication of a,

1. b must be caused by a (together with situational and background conditions)
2. b must be similar in relevant respects to a
3. b must inherit from a the properties that make it relevantly similar to a.

Here is an example:

Imagine one (A) produces a line-drawing (a), see Figure 3, and then shows it to a friend (B) for ten seconds. An asks the friend ten minutes later to reproduce it as exactly as possible with another line-drawing (b). After that, a second person is shown for ten seconds the figure drawn by your friend and presented with the same task. This is iterated with nine further participants. Now, theoretically, it is most likely that each drawing will differ from its model (a) and that the more distant two drawings are in the chain, the more they are likely to differ. Imagine further, you conduct exactly the same little experiment, but with the line-drawing in Figure 4. The result, you theoretically get this time, may be such that "...the distance in the chain of two drawings on the one hand, and their degree of difference on the other hand should be two variables independent of one another."; meaning that it was a chain of stable replications.

Theoretically, this is because Figure 4 looks like a five-branched star, drawn without lifting the pencil, whereas Figure 3 has no perceivable meaning (at least in our western culture), the second chain is a SCCC but not so the first. Arguably and on the one hand, the second causal chain was driven by perceiving the shared meaning of the stimulus by inferring the underlying mental representation and a sequential reproduction of by new behavior. On the other hand, the first causal chain was driven by mere imitation that does not crucially depends on recognition of the underlying meaning. There are forms of inter-individual transfer of behavior that blend reproduction and imitation to different extends. However, the more the meaning of a stimulus is actually reproduced rather than imitated by a subject, the more stable the transfer of the underlying mental representation is supposed to be over time.

== Epidemiology of representations, cognitive science and domain specificity ==
Like cognitive science, the epidemiology of representations is also based on the assumption that domain specificity characterizes cognitive abilities or mechanisms. Epidemiology of representations assumes that human animals are cognitively predefined by their evolved neurophysiology (i.e. their cognition is massively modular). However, it also acknowledges that cognitive development plays a functional role for the formation of mental representations, concepts, intuitive theories, and the like. Accordingly, theories in cognitive science argue that humans are evolutionarily equipped with a certain brain-body setup (cf. common coding theory) that allows them to encode and decode specific kinds of information to their memory via interacting with their environment. This is sensory-specific (i.e. visual-, acoustic-, tactile-, and olfactory perception etc.) and task or reasoning specific (i.e. formulation of intuitive theories). Hence, by these theories, humans are assumed to have (1) an innate cognitive potential that (2) is realized during a natural cognitive development. The reason for the first argument comes from fields like evolutionary anthropology and evolutionary psychology, stating that evolution has been selecting merely those animals that have evolved adaptive mental and neural mechanisms to efficiently cope with specific challenges regarding their environment (e.g. getting food, shelter, mates, etc.). The reason for the second argument comes from cognitive development, stating that animals (especially humans) in their infancy are highly sensitive to input patterns, since their cognitive system automatically and rapidly adapts their environment.

Since the human brain is organized into areas that focus on the processing of distinct sensory input and output and also interact with one another, humans are assumed to learn and perform best in processing those patterns of information for which their neurophysiological system has been evolved. Mental representations manifest, for example, in human long-term memory (Figure 1). Other evidence for massive modularity is that human cognitive performance for respective domains correlates with the degree of damage to the corresponding cortical areas.

== Epidemiology of representations versus memetics ==
The cognitive approach in the epidemiology of representations differs from other philosophical theories with evolutionary orientation, such as memetics, formulated by the British ethologist and evolutionary biologist Richard Dawkins (cf.). Roughly speaking, the three crucial differences between the two approaches are the following:

1. epidemiology of representations atomizes culture to mental representations and individual behavior, whereas memetics atomizes culture to memes
2. individual behavior in SCCC is replicated, whereas memes are imitated (cf. Inter-Individual Stability of Mental Representations)
3. stability of mental representation over time is explained by relevance and domain specificity of individual behavior, whereas stability of memes depends on the benefit of their own transmission.

With the epidemiology of representations, Sperber has argued that the notion of meaning is disregarded in memetics and that this is questionable since the study of society and culture without an explanation of how meaning is perceived and reproduced is contradictory. If memetics, nevertheless, attempts to explain culture based on evolutionary biology, it will need to present empirical evidence for the transfer of memes, that is "...showing that elements of culture inherit all or nearly all their relevant properties from other elements of culture that they replicate ".
