= Defeasibility (linguistics) =

Term in linguistics

In the linguistic field of pragmatics, an inference is said to be defeasible or cancellable if it can be made to disappear by the addition of another statement, or an appropriate context. For example, sentence [i] would normally implicate [ii] by scalar implicature:

i: Alice has three children.
ii: Alice has exactly three children.

But the implicature can be cancelled by the modification in [ib]:

ib: Alice has three children, and possibly more.

Whereas conversational implicatures and presuppositions may be cancelled, an entailment may not be. For example, [i] entails the proposition "Alice has at least three children", and this cannot be cancelled with a modification like:

ic: Alice has three children, and possibly less.

== Explicit and contextual cancellation ==
Grice, the originator of the concept of implicature, draws a distinction between explicit and contextual cancellation. He calls an implicature p explicitly cancellable if it is possible to cancel it by adding a statement to the effect of "but not p" to the utterance which would otherwise implicate it. For example:

There's beer in the fridge. But that's not to say I'm offering you any.

An implicature is contextually cancellable if it can fail to manifest in a different context. For example, if Bob says "We have two spare bedrooms", this would normally implicate that his house has exactly two spare bedrooms. But this implicature disappears if Bob is speaking with Carole and Diane who are planning a visit to Bob's city and looking for a place to stay.
