= Laurence R. Horn =

American linguist (born 1945)

Laurence Robert Horn (born 1945) is an American linguist. He is professor emeritus of linguistics in the department of linguistics at Yale University with specialties in pragmatics and semantics. He received his doctorate in 1972 from UCLA and formerly served as director of undergraduate studies, director of graduate studies, and chair of Yale's department of linguistics. In 2021, he served as president of the Linguistic Society of America.

Horn's primary research program lies in classical logic, lexical semantics, and neo-Gricean pragmatic theory. He mainly focused on the exploration of natural language negation and its relation to other operators. His work in pragmatics, in particular his innovation in the theory of scalar implicature, is widely influential. He is one of the group known as radical pragmaticists in the 1970s (along with Jerrold Sadock and others) and is a veteran of the linguistics wars over generative semantics. The Horn scales are named after him (a pragmatically determined scale over which Gricean generalized conversational implicatures can be calculated). His 1989 book, A natural history of negation, is widely considered to be a masterpiece; in it, he lays out all the major topics concerning negation since Aristotle, and touches on negative polarity as well. Notable is his use of Aristotelian notions such as the Square of Oppositions, and syllogistic logic in a modern semantic/pragmatic setting.

== Publications ==
- Horn, Laurence R. (1984). "A new taxonomy for pragmatic inference: Q-based and R-based implicature". In Schiffrin, Debora (ed.). Meaning, Form, and Use in Context: Linguistic Applications. Washington: Georgetown University Press. pp. 11–42.
- Horn, Laurence R., A Natural History of Negation, 1989; 2nd edn. 2001.
- Horn, Laurence R./ Ward, Gregory L., Handbook of Pragmatics, 2004.
- Kecskes, Istvan/ Horn, Laurence R., Explorations in Pragmatics, 2007.
- Horn, Laurence R., The Expression of Negation, 2010.
