= Laboratoire d'ethnologie et de sociologie comparative =

French research entity

Research Center for Anthropology and Comparative Sociology
- Laboratoire d'ethnologie et de sociologie comparative(LESC)
- Type: Public
- Established: 1967
- Affiliations: CNRS
- Officer in charge: Ministry of Education & Science Technology, France
- Director: Gilles Tarabout
- Location: Nanterre, Ile-de-France, France
- Campus: Nanterre Campus
- Website: http://www.mae.u-paris10.fr/traducteur/endetail3.php?ID=32955=

The Research Center for Anthropology and Comparative Sociology or LESC (Laboratoire d'ethnologie et de sociologie comparative - LESC) is a cross-faculty research entity of the Paris West University Nanterre La Défense and the National Center for Scientific Research (CNRS)

== The French School of Anthropology ==
The center was founded in 1967 at Paris X University by Eric de Dampierre, and associated with the National Scientific Research Council (CNRS) from 1968. In 1989 it became a Mixed Research Unit (UMR). Today it is the UMR 7186.

== Activities ==
The spectrum of research activities covered by the LESC is quite vast, reaching from traditional fieldwork based ethnography to visual anthropology. These activities are conducted mainly within the three scientific research departments:

- Technology
- Americanism
- Ethnomusicology

== Learned societies ==
They are two learned societies housed in the LESC.

- The Société d'ethnologie, created in 1986 by Eric de Dampierre.
- The Société des africanistes, created in 1930.

== Anthropology library ==
The Library named after Eric de Dampierre has one of the largest collection of anthropological reviews and files on Africanist, Americanist and Mongol studies in France.

== Scientific publications ==
- the Ateliers du LESC, is the electronic publication of the laboratory, available free and online on Revues.org, the French public open source science portal.
- Journal des africanistes, published by the société des africanistes since 1931.

== See also ==
- French Anthropology
- Paris West University Nanterre La Défense
- National Center for Scientific Research
- Centre de recherche en ethnomusicologie, Nanterre
