= Relevance theory =

Theory of cognitive linguistics

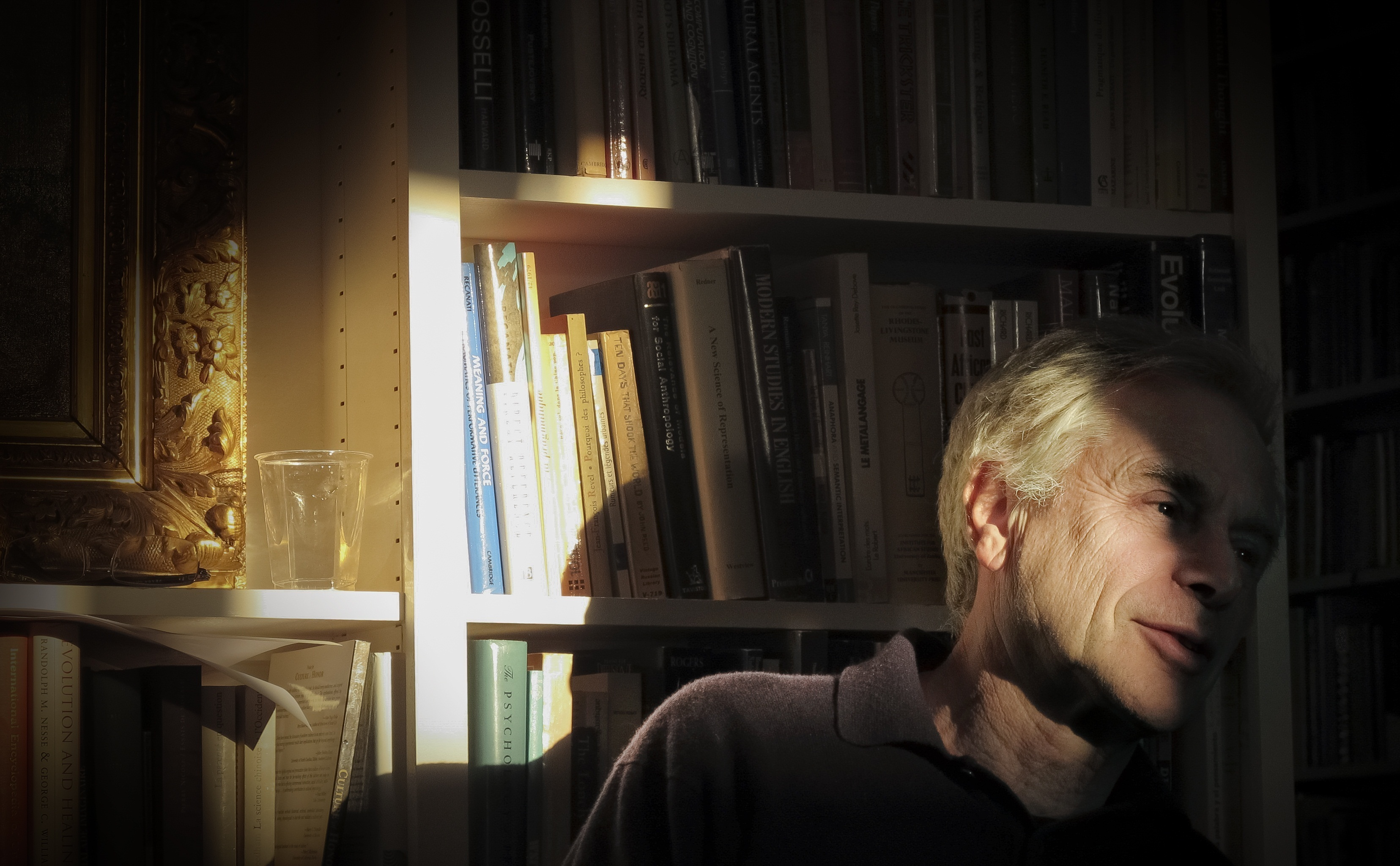
Dan Sperber, who, with Deirdre Wilson, developed relevance theory

Relevance theory is a framework for understanding the interpretation of utterances. It was first proposed by Dan Sperber and Deirdre Wilson, and is used within cognitive linguistics and pragmatics. The theory was originally inspired by the work of Paul Grice and developed out of his ideas, but has since become a pragmatic framework in its own right. The seminal book, Relevance, was first published in 1986 and revised in 1995.

The theory takes its name from the principle that "every utterance conveys the information that it is relevant enough for it to be worth the addressee's effort to process it", that is, if I say something to you, you can safely assume that I believe that the conveyed information is worth your effort to listen to and comprehend it; and also that it is "the most relevant one compatible with the communicator's abilities and preferences", that is, I tried to make the utterance as easy to understand as possible, given its information content and my communicative skills.

Other key ingredients of relevance theory are that utterances are ostensive (they draw their addressees' attention to the fact that the communicator wants to convey some information) and inferential (the addressee has to infer what the communicator wanted to convey, based on the utterance's "literal meaning" along with the addressee's real-world knowledge, sensory input, and other information).

Inferences that are intended by the communicator are categorised into explicatures and implicatures. The explicatures of an utterance are what is explicitly said, often supplemented with contextual information: thus, "Susan told me that her kiwis were too sour" might under certain circumstances explicate "Susan told the speaker that the kiwifruit she, Susan, grew were too sour for the judges at the fruit grower's contest". Implicatures are conveyed without actually stating them: the above utterance might for example implicate "Susan needs to be cheered up" and "The speaker wants the addressee to ring Susan and cheer her up".

Relevance theory also attempts to explain figurative language such as hyperbole, metaphor and irony.

Critics have stated that relevance, in the specialised sense used in this theory, is not defined well enough to be measured. Other criticisms include that the theory is too reductionist to account for the large variety of pragmatic phenomena.

== Overview ==
Relevance theory aims to explain the well-recognized fact that communicators usually convey much more information with their utterances than what is contained in their literal sense. To this end, Sperber and Wilson argue that acts of human verbal communication are ostensive in that they draw their addressees' attention to the fact that the communicator wants to convey some information. In this way, they automatically assert that they are "relevant" to their addressees. A relevant utterance in this technical sense is one from which many conclusions can be drawn at a low processing cost for the addressee.

The addressee uses the information contained in the utterance together with his expectations about its relevance, his real-world knowledge, as well as sensory input, to infer conclusions about what the communicator wanted to convey. Typically, more conclusions can be drawn if the utterance contains information that is related to what the addressee already knows or believes. In this inference process, the "literal meaning" of the utterance is just one piece of evidence among others.

Sperber and Wilson sum up these properties of verbal communication by calling it ostensive-inferential communication. It is characterized by two layers of intention on part of the communicator:

a. The informative intention: The intention to inform an audience of something (to communicate a certain content).
b. The communicative intention: The intention to inform the audience of one's informative intention (to draw the audience's attention to one's informative intention).

== Definitions ==
To describe the claims of relevance theory on a more rigorous level, we need to define a number of technical terms as introduced by Sperber and Wilson.

Manifestness

A fact is manifest to an individual if he is capable of accepting it as true or probably true at the given time.

Cognitive environment

The set of all facts that are manifest to an individual. This comprises everything they can perceive, remember or infer, including facts they are not currently aware of.

Cognitive effect

An effect on an individual's cognitive environment triggered by "outside" information such as utterances directed at the individual. This includes addition of new facts or beliefs, as well as increase or decrease of the confidence in existing beliefs and their rejection, and also the reorganization of information into schemas or maybe other structures to simplify subsequent processing. Typically, an utterance has more cognitive effects if it contains new information that is somehow related to the addressee's current cognitive environment, so that he can draw conclusions from the combined old and new data.

Positive cognitive effect

A cognitive effect that is helpful rather than hindering for the individual (e.g. providing true information as opposed to wrong information). More technically: a cognitive effect that contributes positively to the fulfilment of the individual's cognitive functions and goals.

Relevance of a phenomenon

An utterance – or any other observed phenomenon – is relevant to an individual to the extent that its positive cognitive effects on the individual are large and the mental processing effort to achieve these effects is small.

Relevance is a comparative property: the more positive cognitive effects and the less processing effort, the more relevant the utterance.

== Relevance of an utterance ==
Here are some examples to illustrate the concept of relevance. If Alice and Bob are planning to go on a trip next weekend and Alice tells Bob

(1) Next weekend the weather will be really awful.

this is highly relevant to Bob, as he can draw a host of conclusions, modifying his cognitive environment: Alice wants them to rethink their plans and wants to inform Bob of this wish; Bob agrees – or doesn't agree and just wants to bring oilskins; Alice wants to know Bob's opinion on that matter; etc. By contrast, saying

(2) The weather was really awful on 19 October 1974 in Cumbria.

makes just one piece of new, unrelated information manifest to Bob, and is thus hardly relevant; and

(3) The weather is really awful right now.

is not relevant as it doesn't tell Bob anything new; he has already seen for himself. Finally, the sentence

(4) On the weekend 2717 weeks after 19 October 1974 the weather will be really awful.

contains largely the same information as (1) but requires more effort to process, and is thus less relevant under this definition.

== The two principles of relevance ==
The first or cognitive principle of relevance says that human cognition tends to be geared to the maximisation of relevance. Historically, evolutionary pressure has resulted in cognitive systems that recognise potentially relevant stimuli and try to draw relevant conclusions.

More importantly for the issue at hand, the second or communicative principle of relevance says that every utterance conveys the information that it is

a. relevant enough for it to be worth the addressee's effort to process it. (If the utterance contained too few positive cognitive effects for the addressee in relation to the processing effort needed to achieve these effects, he wouldn't bother processing it, and the communicator needn't have taken the trouble to utter it.)
b. the most relevant one compatible with the communicator's abilities and preferences. (Otherwise the communicator would have chosen a more relevant utterance – e.g. one that needs less processing effort and/or achieves more positive cognitive effects on part of the addressee – to convey her meaning. After all, she wants to be understood as easily and reliably as possible.)

This principle is summed up as "Every utterance conveys a presumption of its own optimal relevance". If Alice tells Bob something – anything –, he is entitled to expect that Alice wanted her utterance to be consistent with the communicative principle of relevance. Consequently, if Alice tells Bob something that does not seem to be worth his processing effort, such as sentences (2) or (3) above, or something that seems to be less relevant than Alice could have put it, such as (4), Bob will automatically search for an alternative interpretation. The most easily accessible interpretation that is consistent with the communicative principle of relevance is the one Bob accepts as the right one, and then he stops processing (because any further interpretations would cost him more processing effort and would thus violate condition b).

The relevance-theoretic comprehension procedure Follow a path of least effort in computing cognitive effects: test interpretive hypotheses in order of accessibility, and stop when your expectations of relevance are satisfied.
— Wilson & Sperber (2002:261)

The constraint that utterances are compatible with the communicator's abilities and preferences accounts for suboptimal communication, such as when the communicator is unable to think of a better phrasing at the moment, as well as for stylistic and cultural preferences (e.g. politeness considerations), withholding information, and lying.

== Inferences ==
=== Explicature ===
On hearing an utterance, the addressee first concludes that the presumption of optimal relevance is met. He then decodes it, which however yields only very incomplete information. Usually, most of the information conveyed by the utterance has to be inferred. The inference process is based on the decoded meaning, the addressee's knowledge and beliefs, and the context, and is guided by the communicative principle of relevance.

For example, take an utterance

(5) Susan told me that her kiwis were too sour.

Information the addressee has to infer includes

- assignment of referents to indexical expressions
  - For the utterance to be relevant, "Susan" most likely has to refer to a Susan both speaker and addressee know.
  - In the absence of other possible female referents, the pronoun "her" has to refer to Susan. (In a different context, as when (5) is preceded by "Lucy didn't like the food at the banquet", a different inference would be drawn.)
- disambiguation of ambiguous expressions
  - Possible interpretations involving sour kiwifruit are far more accessible than ones involving sour birds; and even if the sentence were about birds it would not provide enough context to satisfy condition a of the communicative principle of relevance.
- enrichment of semantically incomplete expressions
  - The possessive "her kiwis" could refer to kiwis Susan ate, kiwis she bought, kiwis she grew herself, etc. Following (5) by "So she didn't win the fruit grower's contest" establishes relevance of the latter option.
  - "too sour" also needs to be specified to make sense. Given the above context, the kiwis must be too sour for the judges at the contest.

Consequently, the explicit meaning of (5) is

(6) Susan told the speaker that the kiwifruit she, Susan, grew were too sour for the judges at the fruit grower's contest.

This is called an explicature of (5).

=== Implicature ===
Further inferences that cannot be understood as specifications and extensions of the original utterance are implicatures. If speaker and addressee know that Susan is a sore loser, an implicature of (5) could be

(7) Susan needs to be cheered up.

The distinction between explicature and implicature is not always clear-cut. For example, the inference

(8) He drank a bottle of vodka and fell into a stupor. → He drank a bottle of vodka and consequently fell into a stupor.

has traditionally been seen as an implicature. However, relevance theorist Robyn Carston has argued that an utterance's implicatures cannot entail any of its explicatures, because the otherwise resulting redundancy would not be consistent with the relevance principle. Therefore, the inference in (8) has to be an explicature, or more specifically a case of enrichment. Another argument for (8) to be an explicature is that it can be embedded in negations and if clauses, which is supposedly impossible for implicatures.

=== Real-time interpretation ===
The described process does not run in sequential order. An addressee of an utterance does not first decode it, then derive explicatures, then select implicated premises from his cognitive environment, and then derive implicated conclusions. Instead, all of these subtasks run in parallel, and each can aid in solving the others.

== Interpretation vs. description ==
— Sperber & Wilson (1995:232)

=== Echoic utterances ===
Sperber and Wilson distinguish the interpretive use of utterances from their descriptive use. An utterance is used descriptively in the "usual" situation where the communicator claims it to represent some state of affairs, i.e. to be true of this state of affairs, as in "It is raining". It is used interpretively if it represents some other utterance or thought, irrespective of the truth or state of affairs, as is the case with direct or indirect quotations, summaries, quoting folk wisdom, linguistic example sentences, tentative scientific hypotheses, etcetera. On a deeper level, every utterance is interpretive of a thought of the speaker's. This makes interpretations of other people's thoughts interpretive to the second degree (path (a) in the diagram).

An utterance that achieves its relevance by interpreting another utterance and expressing some propositional attitude towards it (such as endorsement, doubt, ridicule, etc.) is called echoic. Both attribution and attitude can be made explicit or left implicit; implicit information of course has to be inferred.

(9) Max correctly predicted that it was a good time to buy. (both attribution and attitude explicit)
(10) A good time to buy, I don't think. (attribution implicit, attitude explicit)
(11) A good time to buy, indeed. (both attribution and attitude implicit)

=== Literal and non-literal utterances ===
Just as quotations are not necessarily identical to the material they quote or interpret but only have to resemble it to some extent, an utterance need not be identical to the speaker's thought it interprets. Consequently, there is a continuum from strictly literal and not-quite-literal to figuratively used utterances. Examples for the latter are loose language use (saying "I earn €2000 a month" when one really earns €1997.32), hyperbole, and metaphor. In other words, relevance theory views figurative language, just as literal language, as a description of an actual state of affairs (path (c) in the diagram), the only difference being the extent to which the utterance resembles the speaker's thought. Now if a figurative expression needs less processing effort than the literal expression (as with "I earn €2000"), or has more contextual effects (as with good metaphors), the principle of relevance mandates its use over literalness.

=== Irony ===
Relevance theory explains irony as an echoic utterance with implicit attribution and implicit attitude, the attitude being one of rejection, disapproval, ridicule, or the like. For example, if an overly cautious driver pulls into a main road which is completely clear except for a cyclist on the horizon, the co-driver might reprovingly say "There's something coming". In saying this, he echoes the driver's usual attitude and ridicules it; and this makes the utterance ironic. Just as there is a continuum from literal to metaphorical utterances, there is a continuum of echoic utterances from approving literal quotations to disapproving irony.

=== Speech acts ===
Relevance theory only recognises three types of generic, universal speech acts: saying (that), telling (to), and asking (whether). Other speech acts are either

- culture specific or institutional rather than linguistic (for example, bidding at bridge, promising, or thanking); they have to be learned like all aspects of a culture, or
- not essential to the comprehension process, so that no special pragmatic principles are needed to explain them (for example, asserting, predicting, suggesting, claiming, denying, requesting, warning, threatening).

Saying that is the speech act type associated with declarative sentences and paths (a) and (c) in the diagram. Depending on the context, a declarative utterance of "The bus is leaving" can be an assertion (c), a prediction (c), a report of what the bus driver has said (a), and so on.

Telling to is associated with imperative sentences. These, too, can serve different functions depending on context, such as expressing a request or a desire of the speaker (path (d)), or an advice or a desire of the hearer (path (b)).

(12) Driver to traffic warden: Pretend you didn't see me. (d)
(13) A: Could you tell me the way to the station?

B: Turn right at the traffic lights and keep straight on. (b)

Asking whether is the speech act type for interrogative sentences. To cover not only ordinary questions but also rhetorical questions, exam questions, etc., this speech act type is not analysed as a request for information but as an assertion that the answer would be relevant to the speaker or the hearer. In asking an ordinary question, the speaker expresses that the answer would be relevant to her; in rhetorical questions, she brings something to the addressee's attention that she thinks is relevant to him; etc.

== Criticism ==
The foundations of relevance theory have been criticised because relevance, in the technical sense it is used there, cannot be measured, so it is not possible to say what exactly is meant by "relevant enough" and "the most relevant".

Stephen Levinson sees relevance theory as too reductionist, as a single principle cannot account for the large variety of pragmatic phenomena – such as implicatures – in his view. In particular, he argues that this theory cannot account for generalized conversational implicatures because it is inherently a theory of context dependency. Also, Levinson asserts that relevance theory cannot explain how we arrive at implicated premises via creative processes.

== Contrasted with the conduit metaphor ==
There are two ways to conceive of how thoughts are communicated from one person to another. The first way is through the use of strict coding and decoding (such as is used with Morse code), also known as the Shannon–Weaver model. In this approach the speaker/author encodes their thoughts and transmits them to their audience. The audience receives the encoded message and decodes it to arrive at the meaning the speaker/author intended. This can be visualized as follows:

Speaker's thought/intention ⇒ encoded ⇒ transmitted ⇒ decoded ⇒ intention/thought understood

This is usually referred to as the code model or the conduit metaphor of communication. Human communication, however, is almost never this simple. Context almost always plays a part in communication, as do other factors such as the author's intentions, the relationship between the sender and receiver, and so forth.

The second way of conceiving how thoughts are communicated is by the author/speaker only conveying as much information as is needed in any given context, so that the audience can recover their intended meaning from what was said/written as well as from the context and implications. In this conceptual model, the author takes into account the context of the communication and the mutual cognitive environment between the author and the audience. (That is what the author/speaker thinks that audience already knows.) They then say just enough to communicate what they intend – relying on the audience to fill in the details that they did not explicitly communicate. This can be visualized as follows:

Speaker's thought/intention ± context-mediated information ⇒ encoded ⇒ transmitted ⇒ decoded ± context-mediated information ⇒ thought/intention understood by hearer (an interpretive resemblance to the speaker's intention)

== Bibliography ==
- Carston, Robyn (1988). "Implicature, Explicature, and Truth-Theoretic Semantics". In Kempson, Ruth (ed.). Mental Representations: The Interface between Language and Reality. Cambridge University Press.
- Carston, Robyn (2002). Thoughts and Utterances: The Pragmatics of Explicit Communication. Wiley-Blackwell. ISBN 978-0631214885.
- Davis, Wayne (2019). Implicature. Metaphysics Research Lab, Stanford University.
- Levinson, Stephen (1989). "A review of Relevance". Journal of Linguistics. 25 (2): 455–472. doi:10.1017/S0022226700014183. hdl:11858/00-001M-0000-0013-2D79-6.
- Reddy, M. J. (1979). "The conduit metaphor – a case of frame conflict in our language about language". In Ortony (ed.). Metaphor and Thought. Cambridge University Press.
- Sperber, Dan; Wilson, Deirdre (1995). Relevance: Communication and Cognition. Wiley-Blackwell. ISBN 978-0631198789.
- Wilson, Deirdre; Sperber, Dan (2002). "Relevance Theory" (PDF). UCL Psychology and Language Sciences. This is a useful overview of relevance theory.
