= Linguistic entailment =

Concept in linguistics

Linguistic entailments are entailments which arise in natural language. If a sentence A entails a sentence B, sentence A cannot be true without B being true as well. For instance, the English sentence "Pat is a fluffy cat" entails the sentence "Pat is a cat" since one cannot be a fluffy cat without being a cat. On the other hand, this sentence does not entail "Pat chases mice" since it is possible (if unlikely) for a cat to not chase mice.

Entailments arise from the semantics of linguistic expressions. Entailment contrasts with the pragmatic notion of implicature. While implicatures are fallible inferences, entailments are enforced by lexical meanings plus the laws of logic. Entailments also differ from presuppositions, whose truth is taken for granted. The classic example of a presupposition is the existence presupposition which arises from definite descriptions. For example, the sentence "The king of France is bald" presupposes that there is a king of France. Unlike an entailment, presuppositions survive when the sentence is negated. The negation test can be used to determine the difference between entailment and presupposition. For instance, "The king of France is not bald" likewise presupposes that there is a king of France.

== See also ==
- Downward entailing
- Formal semantics (linguistics)
- Implicature
- Loaded question
- Logical consequence
- Presupposition
