= Dan Sperber =

French academic (born 1942)

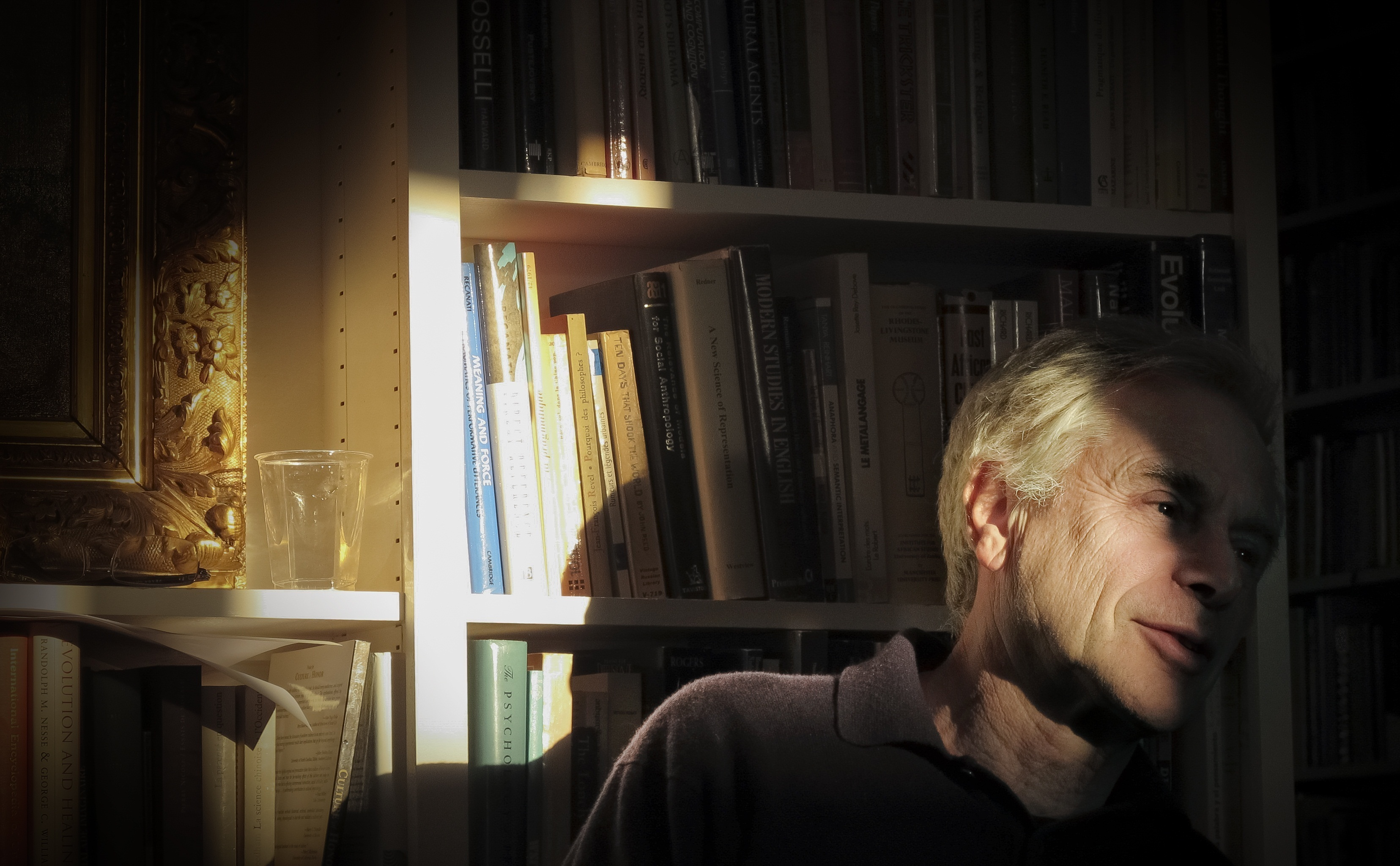
- Sperber in Paris, December 2012
- Born: Dan Sperber; 20 June 1942 (age 84); Cagnes-sur-Mer, France
- Education: Sorbonne; University of Oxford
- Known for: Relevance theory, epidemiology of representations, cultural attraction theory, argumentative theory of reasoning
- Scientific career
- Fields: Cognitive anthropology, cognitive psychology, pragmatics, philosophy

Dan Sperber (born 20 June 1942 in Cagnes-sur-Mer) is a French social and cognitive scientist, anthropologist and philosopher. His most influential work has been in the fields of cognitive anthropology, linguistic pragmatics, psychology of reasoning, and philosophy of the social sciences. He has developed an approach to cultural evolution known as the epidemiology of representations or cultural attraction theory as part of a naturalistic reconceptualization of the social; (with British philosopher and linguist Deirdre Wilson) relevance theory; (with French psychologist Hugo Mercier) the argumentative theory of reasoning. Sperber formerly Directeur de Recherche at the Centre National de la Recherche Scientifique is Professor in the Departments of Cognitive Science and of Philosophy at the Central European University in Budapest.

== Background ==
Sperber is the son of Austrian-French novelist Manès Sperber. He was born in France and raised an atheist but his parents, both non-religious Ashkenazi Jews, imparted to the young Sperber a "respect for my Rabbinic ancestors and for religious thinkers of any persuasion more generally". He became interested in anthropology as a means of explaining how rational people come to hold mistaken religious beliefs about the supernatural.

== Career ==
Sperber was trained in anthropology at the Sorbonne and the University of Oxford. In 1965 he joined the Centre National de la Recherche Scientifique (CNRS) as a researcher, initially in the Laboratoire d'Études Africaines (African studies laboratory). Later he moved to the Laboratoire d'ethnologie et de sociologie comparative (Ethnology and Comparative Sociology), the Centre de Recherche en Epistémologie Appliquée and finally, from 2001, the Institut Jean Nicod. Sperber's early work was on the anthropology of religion, and he conducted ethnographic fieldwork among the Dorze people of Ethiopia.

Sperber was initially attracted to structural anthropology, having been introduced to it by Rodney Needham at Oxford. He attended the seminar of Claude Lévi-Strauss, credited as the founder of structuralism, who encouraged Sperber's "untypical theoretical musings". Sperber, however, soon developed a more critical attitude to structuralism and objected to the use of interpretive ethnographic data as if it were an objective record, and for its lack of explanatory power. Nevertheless, Sperber has persistently defended the legacy of Lévi-Strauss' work as opening the door for naturalistic social science, and as an important precursor to cognitive anthropology.

After moving away from structuralism, Sperber sought an alternative naturalistic approach to the study of culture. His 1975 book Rethinking Symbolism, outlined a theory of symbolism using concepts from the burgeoning field of cognitive psychology. It was formulated as a reply to semiological theories which were becoming widespread in anthropology through the works of Victor Turner and Clifford Geertz (which formed the basis of what come to be known as symbolic anthropology). Sperber's later work has continued to argue for the importance of cognitive processes understood through psychology in understanding cultural phenomena and, in particular, cultural transmission. His 'epidemiology of representations' is an approach to cultural evolution inspired by the field of epidemiology. It proposes that the distribution of cultural representations (ideas about the world held by multiple individuals) within a population should be explained with reference to biases in transmission (illuminated by cognitive and evolutionary psychology) and the "ecology" of the individual minds they inhabit. Sperber's approach is broadly Darwinist—it explains the macro-distribution of a trait in a population in terms of the cumulative effect micro-processes acting over time—but departs from memetics because he does not see representations as replicators except for in a few special circumstances (such as chain letters). The cognitive and epidemiological approach to cultural evolution has been influential, and has been described by the philosopher Kim Sterelny as "the Paris School" contrasted to the "California School" of Rob Boyd and Peter Richerson His latest work, published with cognitive scientist Hugo Mercier, has developed their argumentative theory of reasoning into a more general interactionist approach to reason. His most influential work is arguably in linguistics and philosophy: with the British linguist and philosopher Deirdre Wilson he has developed an innovative approach to linguistic interpretation known as relevance theory which as of 2010 has become mainstream in the area of pragmatics, linguistics, artificial intelligence and cognitive psychology. He argues that cognitive processes are geared toward the maximisation of relevance, that is, a search for an optimal balance between cognitive efforts and cognitive effects.

As well as his emeritus position at the CNRS, Sperber is currently professor in the departments of Cognitive Science and of Philosophy at Central European University. He is also the Director of the International Cognition and Culture Institute, a scientific discussion and research website. He has been visiting professor in philosophy at Princeton (1989, 1990, 1992, 1993), the University of Michigan at Ann Arbor (1994, 1997), the University of Hong Kong (1997), the University of Chicago (2010); in anthropology at the London School of Economics (1988, 1998, 200, 2003, 2004, 2005, 2006); in linguistics at University College London (1992, 2007–2008); in communication at the Università di Bologna (1998). He is a Corresponding Fellow of the British Academy. ). He has been awarded Rivers Memorial Medal, Royal Anthropological Institute, London in 1991, the Silver Medal of the CNRS in 2002 and in 2009 was awarded the inaugural Claude Lévi-Strauss Prize for excellence of French research in the humanities and social sciences. His named lectures include the Malinowski Memorial Lecture, London School of Economics, 1984; the Mircea Eliade Lectures on Religion, Western Michigan University, 1992; the Henry Sweet Lecture Linguistics Association of Great Britain, 1998; the Radcliffe-Brown Lecture, British Academy, 1999; the Robert Hertz lecture, EHESS, Paris, 2005, the Lurcy Lecture, University of Chicago, 2010; (With Hugo Mercier) the Chandaria Lectures, Institute of Philosophy, University of London, 2011; the Carl Hempel Lectures, Princeton University, Department of Philosophy, 2017.

== Bibliography ==
- Le structuralisme en anthropologie (Éditions du Seuil, 1973)
- Rethinking Symbolism (Cambridge University Press, 1975)
- On Anthropological Knowledge (Cambridge University Press, 1985)
- (with Deirdre Wilson) Relevance. Communication and Cognition (Blackwell, 1986)
- (with David Premack & Ann James Premack, eds.) Causal Cognition: A multidisciplinary debate. (Oxford University Press, 1995)
- Explaining Culture (Blackwell, 1996)
- (Ed.) Metarepresentations: A multidisciplinary perspective (Oxford University Press, 2000)
- (With Ira Noveck, eds.) Experimental Pragmatics (Palgrave, 2004)
- (with Deirdre Wilson), Meaning and Relevance (Cambridge University Press, 2012)
- (with Hugo Mercier), The Enigma of Reason (Harvard University Press, 2017), ISBN 9780674368309

== Awards ==
- Prix Claude-Lévi-Strauss 2009 (Académie des Sciences Morales et Politiques, Paris – First laureate)
- Mind and Brain Prize 2009 (Università degli studi di Torino)
- Silver Medal, CNRS, 2002
- Rivers Memorial Medal, Royal Anthropological Institute, London, 1991.

== See also ==
- Scott Atran
- Maurice Bloch
- Pascal Boyer
