= Deirdre Wilson =

British linguist and cognitive scientist (born 1941)

Deirdre Wilson FBA
- Born: Deirdre Susan Moir Wilson; 1941 (age 84–85)
- Known for: Developer of Relevance theory

Academic background
- Education: Somerville College, Oxford; Massachusetts Institute of Technology
- Doctoral advisor: Noam Chomsky
- Influences: Jerry Fodor; H. P. Grice

Academic work
- Discipline: Linguistics
- Sub-discipline: Pragmatics; Philosophy of language
- Institutions: Somerville College, Oxford
- Notable students: Stephen Neale; Robyn Carston; Tim Wharton

Deirdre Susan Moir Wilson (born 1941) is a British linguist and cognitive scientist. She is emeritus professor of Linguistics at University College London and research professor at the Centre for the Study of Mind in Nature at the University of Oslo. Her most influential work has been in linguistic pragmatics—specifically in the development of Relevance Theory with French anthropologist Dan Sperber. This work has been especially influential in the Philosophy of Language. Important influences on Wilson are Noam Chomsky, Jerry Fodor, and Paul Grice. Linguists and philosophers of language who have been students of Wilson include Stephen Neale (CUNY Graduate Center), Robyn Carston (University College London) and Tim Wharton (University of Brighton).

== Biography ==
Wilson studied PPE at Somerville College, Oxford and subsequently completed her Bachelor of Philosophy while working with philosopher H. P. Grice. She completed her PhD (Doctor of Philosophy) at the Massachusetts Institute of Technology with linguist Noam Chomsky as her dissertation advisor. She was a lecturer at Somerville College, Oxford.

== Work ==
Wilson's work is in linguistic pragmatics. Pragmatics is the study of how contextual factors interact with linguistic meaning in the interpretation of utterances. Her 1975 book Presuppositions and Non-Truth-Conditional Semantics advocated a pragmatic approach to presuppositions. In her longstanding collaboration with French Anthropologist Dan Sperber she has published many books and articles over 30 years. Their 1986 book Relevance: Communication and Cognition laid the foundation for Relevance Theory which they have continued to develop in subsequent books and articles.

Relevance Theory is, roughly, the theory that the aim of an interpreter is to find an interpretation of the speaker's meaning that satisfies the presumption of optimal relevance. An input is relevant to an individual when it connects with available contextual assumptions to yield positive cognitive effects.

== Publications ==
Novels

- Wilson, D. Slave of the Passions. Picador. 1992.

Academic books

- Wilson, D. Presuppositions and Non-Truth-Conditional Semantics. Academic Press. 1975.
- Sperber, D. & Wilson, D. Relevance: Communication and Cognition. Oxford University Press. 1986.
- Wilson, D. & Sperber, D. Meaning and Relevance. Cambridge University Press. 2012.
