= Robyn Carston =

New Zealand linguist and academic

Professor Robyn Carston FBA
- Title: Professor of Linguistics

Academic background
- Education: University of Canterbury; Victoria University of Wellington; University College London
- Thesis: Pragmatics and the explicit/implicit distinction (1994)
- Doctoral advisor: Deirdre Wilson

Academic work
- Discipline: Linguistics
- Sub-discipline: Pragmatics; Semantics; Philosophy of language

Robyn Anne Carston, FBA is a linguist and academic, who specialises in pragmatics, semantics, and the philosophy of language. Since 2005, she has been Professor of Linguistics at University College London.

== Early life and education ==
Carston was born in New Zealand. She studied English literature at the University of Canterbury, graduating with a Bachelor of Arts (BA) 1975. She then studied for an honours degree in linguistics at Victoria University of Wellington, graduating with a BA (Hons) degree in 1976. She moved to England to study at University College London (UCL), graduating with a Master of Arts (MA) with Distinction in Phonetics and Linguistics in 1980. She remained at UCL to undertake postgraduate research under the supervision of Deirdre Wilson. and got her first job as a lecturer there in 1983. She completed her Doctor of Philosophy (PhD) degree in 1994. Her doctoral thesis was titled "Pragmatics and the explicit/implicit distinction".

== Academic career ==
Carston has taught linguistics at University College London since 1983. Since January 1999, she has been an editor of the peer-reviewed interdisciplinary journal Mind & Language. In January 2005, she was appointed Professor of Linguistics. From 2007 to 2017, she was additionally a senior researcher at the Centre for the Study of Mind in Nature, University of Oslo. Since August 2017, she has been President of the European Society for Philosophy and Psychology.

== Honours ==
In July 2016, Carston was elected a Fellow of the British Academy (FBA), the UK's national academy for the humanities and the social sciences.

== Selected works ==
- Carston, Robyn; Uchida, Seiji, eds. (1998). Relevance theory: applications and implications. Amsterdam: Benjamins. ISBN 978-1556193309.
- Carston, Robyn (2002). Thoughts and utterances: the pragmatics of explicit communication. Oxford: Blackwell. ISBN 978-0631214885.
