= Paul Grice =

British philosopher of language (1913–1988)

- Born: Herbert Paul Grice; 13 March 1913; Birmingham, England
- Died: 28 August 1988 (aged 75); Berkeley, California, U.S.

Education
- Education: Corpus Christi College, Oxford

Philosophical work
- Era: 20th-century philosophy
- Region: Western philosophy
- School: Analytic philosophy
- Institutions: St John's College, Oxford; University of California, Berkeley
- Notable students: Cora Diamond; P. F. Strawson
- Main interests: Philosophy of language; Semantics; Pragmatics; Metaphysics; Epistemology; History of philosophy
- Notable ideas: Conversational implicature · speaker meaning · Gricean maxims · Grice's paradox · Causal theory of perception

Herbert Paul Grice (13 March 1913 – 28 August 1988), usually publishing under the name H. P. Grice, H. Paul Grice, or Paul Grice, was a British philosopher of language who created the theory of implicature and the cooperative principle (with its namesake Gricean maxims), which became foundational concepts in the linguistic field of pragmatics. His work on meaning has also influenced the philosophical study of semantics.

== Life ==
Born in Birmingham, Grice was educated at Clifton College and then at Corpus Christi College, Oxford. After a brief period teaching at Rossall School, he went back to Oxford, firstly as a graduate student at Merton College from 1936 to 1938, and then as a Lecturer, Fellow and Tutor from 1938 at St John's College. Among his pupils was P.F. Strawson, who he would later collaborate with. During the Second World War Grice served in the Royal Navy; after the war he returned to his Fellowship at St John's, which he held until 1967. In that year, he moved to the United States to take up a professorship at the University of California, Berkeley, where he taught until his death in 1988. He returned to the UK in 1979 to give the John Locke lectures on Aspects of Reason. He reprinted many of his essays and papers in his valedictory book, Studies in the Way of Words (1989).

Grice married Kathleen Watson in 1942; they had two children.

== Work ==
=== Grice on meaning ===
One of Grice's two most influential contributions to the study of language and communication is his theory of meaning, which he began to develop in his article "Meaning", written in 1948 but published only in 1957 at the prodding of his colleague, P. F. Strawson. Grice further developed his theory of meaning in the fifth and sixth of his William James lectures on "Logic and Conversation", delivered at Harvard in 1967. These two lectures were initially published as "Utterer's Meaning and Intentions" in 1969 and "Utterer's Meaning, Sentence Meaning, and Word Meaning" in 1968, and were later collected with the other lectures as the first section of Studies in the Way of Words in 1989.

==== Natural vs. non-natural meaning ====
In the 1957 article "Meaning", Grice describes "natural meaning" using the example of "Those spots mean (meant) measles."

And describes "non-natural meaning" using the example of "John means that he'll be late" or "'Schnee' means 'snow'".

Grice does not define these two senses of the verb 'to mean', and does not offer an explicit theory that separates the ideas they're used to express. Instead, he relies on five differences in ordinary language usage to show that we use the word in (at least) two different ways.

==== Intention-based semantics ====
For the rest of "Meaning", and in his discussions of meaning in "Logic and Conversation", Grice deals exclusively with non-natural meaning. His overall approach to the study of non-natural meaning later came to be called "intention-based semantics" because it attempts to explain non-natural meaning based on the idea of speakers' intentions.

To do this, Grice distinguishes two kinds of non-natural meaning:

- The "utterer's meaning" of what a speaker means by an utterance. (Grice did not introduce this label until "Logic and Conversation". The more common label in contemporary work is "speaker meaning", though Grice did not use that term.)
- The "timeless meaning" that can be possessed by a type of utterance such as a word or a sentence, rather than by an individual speaker. (This is often called "conventional meaning", although Grice did not call it that.)

The two steps in intention-based semantics are to define utterer's meaning in terms of speakers' overt audience-directed intentions, and then to define timeless meaning in terms of utterer's meaning. The net effect is to define all linguistic notions of meaning in purely mental terms, and to thus shed psychological light on the semantic realm.

Grice tries to accomplish the first step by means of the following definition:

"A meant_{NN} something by x" is roughly equivalent to "A uttered x with the intention of inducing a belief by means of the recognition of this intention".

(In this definition, 'A' is a variable ranging over speakers and 'x' is a variable ranging over utterances.) Grice generalises this definition of speaker meaning later in 'Meaning' so that it applies to commands and questions, which, he argues, differ from assertions in that the speaker intends to induce an intention rather than a belief. Grice's initial definition was controversial, and seemingly gives rise to a variety of counterexamples, and so later adherents of intention-based semantics—including Grice himself, Stephen Schiffer, Jonathan Bennett, Dan Sperber and Deirdre Wilson, and Stephen Neale—have attempted to improve on it in various ways while keeping the basic idea intact.

Grice next turns to the second step in his program: explaining the notion of timeless meaning in terms of the notion of utterer's meaning. He does so very tentatively with the following definition:

"x means_{NN} (timeless) that so-and-so" might as a first shot be equated with some statement or disjunction of statements about what "people" (vague) intend (with qualifications about "recognition") to effect by x.

The basic idea here is that the meaning of a word or sentence results from a regularity in what speakers use the word or sentence to mean. Grice would give a much more detailed theory of timeless meaning in his sixth Logic and Conversation lecture. A more influential attempt to expand on this component of intention-based semantics has been given by Stephen Schiffer.

=== Grice's theory of implicature ===
Grice's most influential contribution to philosophy and linguistics is his theory of implicature, which started in his 1961 article, "The Causal Theory of Perception", and "Logic and Conversation", which was delivered at Harvard's 'William James Lectures' in 1967, and published in 1975 as a chapter in volume 3 of Syntax and Semantics: Speech Acts.

==== Saying/implicating distinction ====
According to Grice, what a speaker means by an utterance can be divided into what the speaker "says" and what the speaker thereby "implicates".

Grice makes it clear that the notion of saying he has in mind, though related to a colloquial sense of the word, is somewhat technical, referring to it as "a favored notion of 'saying' that must be further elucidated". Nonetheless, Grice never settled on a full elucidation or definition of his favoured notion of saying, and the interpretation of this notion has become a contentious issue in the philosophy of language.

One point of controversy surrounding Grice's favoured notion of saying is the connection between it and his concept of utterer's meaning. Grice makes it clear that he takes saying to be a kind of meaning, in the sense that doing the former entails doing the latter: "I want to say that (1) "U (utterer) said that p" entails (2) "U did something x by which U meant that p" (87). This condition is controversial, but Grice argues that apparent counterexamples—cases in which a speaker apparently says something without meaning it—are actually examples of what he calls "making as if to say", which can be thought of as a kind of "mock saying" or "play saying".

Another point of controversy surrounding Grice's notion of saying is the relationship between what a speaker says with an expression and the expression's timeless meaning. Although he attempts to spell out the connection in detail several times, the most precise statement that he endorses is the following one:

In the sense in which I am using the word say, I intend what someone has said to be closely related to the conventional meaning of the words (the sentence) he has uttered.

Grice never spelled out what he meant by the phrase "closely related" in this passage, and philosophers of language continue to debate over its best interpretation.

In "The Causal Theory of Perception", Grice contrasts saying (which he there also calls "stating") with "implying", but in "Logic and Conversation" he introduces the technical term "implicature" and its cognates "to implicate" and "implicatum" (i.e., that which is implicated). Grice justifies this neologism by saying that "'Implicature' is a blanket word to avoid having to make choices between words like 'imply', 'suggest', 'indicate', and 'mean'".

Grice sums up these notions by suggesting that to implicate is to perform a "non-central" speech act, whereas to say is to perform a "central" speech act. As others have more commonly put the same distinction, saying is a kind of "direct" speech act whereas implicating is an "indirect" speech act. This latter way of drawing the distinction is an important part of John Searle's influential theory of speech acts.

==== Conventional vs. conversational implicature ====
Although Grice is best known for his theory of conversational implicature, he also introduced the notion of conventional implicature. The difference between the two lies in the fact that what a speaker conventionally implicates by uttering a sentence is tied in some way to the timeless meaning of part of the sentence, whereas what a speaker conversationally implicates is not directly connected with timeless meaning. Grice's best-known example of conventional implicature involves the word 'but', which, he argues, differs in meaning from the word 'and' only in that we typically conventionally implicate something over and above what we say with the former but not with the latter. In uttering the sentence 'She was poor but she was honest', for example, we say merely that she was poor and she was honest, but we implicate that poverty contrasts with honesty (or that her poverty contrasts with her honesty).

Grice makes it clear that what a speaker conventionally implicates by uttering a sentence is part of what the speaker means in uttering it, and that it is also closely connected to what the sentence means. Nonetheless, what a speaker conventionally implicates is not a part of what the speaker says.

U's doing x might be his uttering the sentence "She was poor but she was honest". What U meant, and what the sentence means, will both contain something contributed by the word "but", and I do not want this contribution to appear in an account of what (in my favored sense) U said (but rather as a conventional implicature).

Grice did not elaborate much on the notion of conventional implicature, but many other authors have tried to give more extensive theories of it, including Lauri Karttunen and Stanley Peters, Kent Bach, Stephen Neale, and Christopher Potts.

==== Conversational implicature ====
To conversationally implicate something in speaking, according to Grice, is to mean something that goes beyond what one says in such a way that it must be inferred from non-linguistic features of a conversational situation together with general principles of communication and co-operation.

The general principles Grice proposed are what he called the Cooperative principle and the Maxims of Conversation. According to Grice, the cooperative principle is a norm governing all cooperative interactions among humans.

Cooperative Principle: "Make your contribution such as it is required, at the stage at which it occurs, by the accepted purpose or direction of the talk exchange in which you are engaged." (Grice 1989: 26).

The conversational maxims can be thought of as precisifications of the cooperative principle that deal specifically with communication.

Maxim of Quantity: Information

- Make your contribution as informative as is required for the current purposes of the exchange.
- Do not make your contribution more informative than is required.

Maxim of Quality: Truth (supermaxim: "Try to make your contribution one that is true")

- Do not say what you believe to be false.
- Do not say that for which you lack adequate evidence.

Maxim of Relation: Relevance

- Be relevant.

Maxim of Manner: Clarity (supermaxim: "Be perspicuous")

- Avoid obscurity of expression.
- Avoid ambiguity.
- Be brief (avoid prolixity).
- Be orderly.

Grice follows his summary of the maxims by suggesting that "one might need others" (i.e. the list is not necessarily exhaustive), and goes on to say that "There are, of course, all sorts of other maxims (aesthetic, social, or moral in character), such as "Be polite", that are also normally observed by participants in exchanges, and these may also generate nonconventional implicatures."

Conversational implicatures are made possible, according to Grice, by the fact that the participants in a conversation always assume each other to behave according to the maxims. So, when a speaker appears to have violated a maxim by saying or making as if to say something that is false, uninformative or too informative, irrelevant, or unclear, the assumption that the speaker is in fact obeying the maxims causes the interpreter to infer a hypothesis about what the speaker really meant. That an interpreter will reliably make such inferences allows speakers to intentionally "flout" the maxims—i.e., create the appearance of breaking the maxims in a way that is obvious to both speaker and interpreter—to get their implicatures across.

Perhaps Grice's best-known example of conversational implicature is the case of the reference letter, a "quantity implicature" (i.e., because it involves flouting the first maxim of Quantity):

A is writing a testimonial about a pupil who is a candidate for a philosophy job, and his letter reads as follows: "Dear Sir, Mr. X's command of English is excellent, and his attendance at tutorials has been regular. Yours, etc." (Gloss: A cannot be opting out, since if he wished to be uncooperative, why write at all? He cannot be unable, through ignorance, to say more, since the man is his pupil; moreover, he knows that more information than this is wanted. He must, therefore, be wishing to impart information that he is reluctant to write down. This supposition is tenable only if he thinks Mr. X is no good at philosophy. This, then, is what he is implicating.)

Given that a speaker means a given proposition p by a given utterance, Grice suggests several features which p must possess to count as a conversational implicature.

Nondetachability: "The implicature is nondetachable insofar as it is not possible to find another way of saying the same thing (or approximately the same thing) which simply lacks the implicature."

Cancelability: "...a putative conversational implicature is explicitly cancelable if, to the form of words the utterance of which putatively implicates that p, it is admissible to add but not p, or I do not mean to imply that p, and it is contextually cancelable if one can find situations in which the utterance of the form of words would simply not carry the implicature."

Non-conventionality: "...conversational implicata are not part of the meaning of the expressions to the employment of which they attach."

Calculability: "The presence of a conversational implicature must be capable of being worked out; for even if it can in fact be intuitively grasped, unless the intuition is replaceable by an argument, the implicature (if present at all) will not count as a conversational implicature; it will be a conventional implicature."

==== Generalised vs. particularised conversational implicature ====
Grice also distinguishes between generalised and particularised conversational implicature. Grice says that particularised conversational implicatures (such as in the reference letter case quoted above) arise in "cases in which an implicature is carried by saying that p on a particular occasion in virtue of special features about the context, cases in which there is no room for the idea that an implicature of this sort is normally carried by saying that p." Generalized implicature, by contrast, arise in cases in which "one can say that the use of a certain form of words in an utterance would normally (in the absence of special circumstances) carry such-and-such an implicature or type of implicature." Grice does not offer a full theory of generalised conversational implicatures that distinguishes them from particularised conversational implicatures, on one hand, and from conventional implicatures, on the other hand, but later philosophers and linguists have attempted to expand on the idea of generalised conversational implicatures.

=== Grice's paradox ===
In his book Studies in the Way of Words (1989), he presents what he calls Grice's paradox. In it, he supposes that two chess players, Yog and Zog, play 100 games under the following conditions:

(1) Yog is white nine of ten times.
(2) There are no draws.

And the results are:

(1) Yog, when white, won 80 of 90 games.
(2) Yog, when black, won zero of ten games.

This implies that:

(i) 8/9 times, if Yog was white, Yog won.
(ii) 1/2 of the time, if Yog lost, Yog was black.
(iii) 9/10 that either Yog wasn't white or he won.

From these statements, it might appear one could make these deductions by contraposition and conditional disjunction:

([a] from [ii]) If Yog was white, then 1/2 of the time Yog won.
([b] from [iii]) 9/10 times, if Yog was white, then he won.

But both (a) and (b) are untrue—they contradict (i). In fact, (ii) and (iii) don't provide enough information to use Bayesian reasoning to reach those conclusions. That might be clearer if (i)-(iii) had instead been stated like so:

(i) When Yog was white, Yog won 8/9 times. (No information is given about when Yog was black.)
(ii) When Yog lost, Yog was black 1/2 the time. (No information is given about when Yog won.)
(iii) 9/10 times, either Yog was black and won, Yog was black and lost, or Yog was white and won. (No information is provided on how the 9/10 is divided among those three situations.)

Grice's paradox shows that the exact meaning of statements involving conditionals and probabilities is more complicated than may be obvious on casual examination.

=== Criticisms ===
Relevance theory of Dan Sperber and Deirdre Wilson builds on and also challenges Grice's theory of meaning and his account of pragmatic inference. The theory argues that Grice's four Maxims of Conversation can be reduced to (and are implied by) a single one: "Be relevant" (because every utterance conveys a presumption of its own optimal relevance).
