= Department of Philosophy, University of Warwick =

UK academic institution

- Parent institution: University of Warwick
- Head of Department: Guy Longworth
- Website: Department of Philosophy

The Department of Philosophy is an academic division in the Faculty of Social Sciences at the University of Warwick. It is known for its strengths in Continental philosophy.

== Rankings ==
The Times places the department 3rd and The Guardian 6th in the UK in their respective 2021 league tables for best UK universities for philosophy.

The Philosophical Gourmet Report lists the department 8th in the UK, and 3rd and 6th in the English speaking world for 19th and 20th century continental philosophy respectively. It also ranks the department 10th in Political Philosophy, 13th in Applied Ethics, 14th in Kant, 15th in Philosophy of Mathematics and Philosophy of Law, and among the 12 "Highly Recommended" PhD programmes in Philosophy of Art.

QS World University Rankings places the department 9th in the UK and 43rd globally in 2021.

== Awards ==
The department has been awarded a Bronze Athena Swan award by the Equality Challenge Unit.

== Journal ==
The Department publishes Pli: The Warwick Journal of Philosophy which is focused upon European philosophical traditions.

== Permanent faculty ==
- Sameer Bajaj
- Stephen Butterfill
- Lucy Campbell
- Quassim Cassam
- Diarmuid Costello
- Thomas Crowther
- Walter Dean
- Benedict Eastaugh
- Naomi Eilan
- Nadine Elzein
- Benjamin Ferguson
- Christoph Hoerl
- Stephen Houlgate
- David James
- Eileen John
- Tobias Keiling
- Henrik Kugelberg
- Hemdat Lerman
- Guy Longworth
- Richard Moore
- Matthew Nudds
- Fabienne Peter
- Johannes Roessler
- Lorenzo Serini
- Karen Simecek
- Tom Sorell
- Eliza Starbuck Little
- Kirk Surgener
- Patrick Tomlin
- Curie Virag
- Barney Walker
- Heather Widdows
- David Bather Woods

== Emeritus faculty ==
- Roger Trigg
- Christine Battersby
- David Miller
- Peter Poellner

== Former faculty ==
- Andrew Benjamin
- Miguel Beistegui
- Bill Brewer
- Andrew Huddleston
- Nick Land
- Sadie Plant
- Keith Ansell-Pearson

== Notable alumni ==
- Andrew Benjamin
- Brian Deer
- Keith W. Faulkner
- Kit Fine
- Steve Goodman
- Beth Lord
- Michael Andrew Lewis
- Pippa Norris
- Jeremy Weate
- Reza Negarestani
- Alberto Toscano
- Mark Fisher
- Ray Brassier
