= Anastasia Giannakidou =

Linguist

- Occupation: Linguist
- Known for: nonveridicality

Academic background
- Education: University of Groningen (PhD); Aristotle University of Thessaloniki (BA, MA)
- Thesis: The landscape of polarity items (1997)
- Doctoral advisor: Frans Zwarts; Jack Hoeksema

Academic work
- Discipline: Linguistics
- Sub-discipline: Semantics; Pragmatics
- Institutions: University of Chicago
- Website: home.uchicago.edu/~giannaki

Anastasia Giannakidou is the Frank J. McLoraine Professor of Linguistics at the University of Chicago. She is the founder and inaugural director of the Center for Hellenic Studies at the University of Chicago, and co-director of Center for Gesture, Sign and Language. She is best known for her work on veridicality, polarity phenomena, modal sentences, and the interactions of tense and modality. She holds a Research Associate position at Institut Jean Nicod, Ecole Normale Superieure, Paris, is a faculty fellow at the institute on the Formation of Knowledge, and is an associate member of Bilingualism Research Lab at the University of Illinois at Chicago.

== Education and career ==
Giannakidou earned her BA in Greek Philology and Linguistics at the University of Thessaloniki in 1989, and her PhD in linguistics at the University of Groningen in 1997. The title of her thesis is The landscape of polarity items, published with Groningen Dissertations in Linguistics (GRODIL) 18. The dissertation received the Dissertation Award (Dissertatieprijs) of the Linguistics Association of the Netherlands for the best dissertation in Linguistics in 1998.

Before joining the University of Chicago in 2002, Giannakidou was a senior Fellow of the Royal Dutch Academy of Sciences (KNAW), Center for Language and Cognition, Department of Dutch, Frisian and Low Saxon, University of Groningen between the years 1999–2002. Between 1997 and 1999 she was a Grotius Fellow, Institute for Logic, Language and Computation (ILLC), Department of Philosophy, University of Amsterdam. In 1998-1999 she was a visiting assistant professor, Dept. of Byzantine and Modern Greek Studies, University of Cyprus.

Giannakidou serves on the editorial boards of the Journal of Greek Linguistics, Semantics and Pragmatics, Edinburgh Advanced Linguistics, Time in Language and Thought, and Chicago Studies in Linguistics.

== Grants and awards ==
Giannakidou has won several awards from granting agencies, including the Deutsche Forschungsgemeinschaft (DFG) and the National Institutes of Health (NIH). From 1999 to 2002 she was a Fellow at the Royal Dutch Academy of Sciences.

== Selected publications ==
=== Books and edited volumes ===
- 2016. Revisiting Mood, Aspect and Modality: What is a linguistic category? Blaszczak, J., Anastasia Giannakidou, D. Klimek-Jankowska, Kryzstof Mygdalski (eds). University of Chicago Press.
- 2013. The Nominal Structure in Slavic and beyond. Urtzi Etxeberria, Lilia Schurcks (eds), Series: Studies in Generative Grammar 116, Mouton de Gruyter. ISBN 978-1-61451-279-0.
- 2009. Quantification, Definiteness, and Nominalization. Giannakidou Anastasia and Monika Rathert (eds), Series Oxford Studies in Theoretical Linguistics, Oxford University Press.
- 1998. Polarity Sensitivity as (Non)veridical Dependency. John Benjamins, Amsterdam-Philadelphia.

=== Articles ===
- 2018. Giannakidou, A. and A. Mari, The semantic roots of positive polarity: epistemic modal verbs and adverbs in English, Greek and Italian. Linguistics and Philosophy 41(6): 623–664.
- 2016. Giannakidou, A. and S. Yoon. Scalar marking without scalar meaning: non-scalar, non-exhaustive NPIs in Greek and Korean. Language 92: 522–556.
- 2011. Giannakidou, A. and S. Yoon. The subjective mode of comparison: metalinguistic comparatives in Greek and Korean. Natural Language and Linguistic Theory 29:621-655.
- 2007. Giannakidou, A. The landscape of EVEN. Natural Language and Linguistic Theory 25: 39–81. 13.
- 2006. Giannakidou, A. Only, emotive factives, and the dual nature of polarity dependency. Language, 82: 575–603. 14.
- 2006. Giannakidou, A. and L. L.-S. Cheng. (In)Definiteness, polarity, and the role of wh-morphology in free choice. Journal of Semantics 23: 135–183.
- 2000. Giannakidou, A. Negative ... concord? Natural Language and Linguistic Theory 18: 457–523.
