= Scalar implicature =

Term in linguistics

In pragmatics, scalar implicature, or quantity implicature, is an implicature that attributes an implicit meaning beyond the explicit or literal meaning of an utterance, and which suggests that the utterer had a reason for not using a more informative or stronger term on the same scale. The choice of the weaker characterization suggests that, as far as the speaker knows, none of the stronger characterizations in the scale holds. This is commonly seen in the use of 'some' to suggest the meaning 'not all', even though 'some' does not necessarily preclude 'all'. If Bill says 'I have some of my money in cash', this utterance suggests to a hearer (though the sentence uttered does not logically imply it) that Bill does not have all his money in cash.

== Origin ==
Scalar implicatures typically arise where the speaker qualifies or scales their statement with language that conveys to the listener an inference or implicature that indicates that the speaker had reasons not to use a stronger, more informative, term. For example, where a speaker uses the term "some" in the statement, "Some students can afford a new car.", the use of "some" gives rise to an inference or implicature that "Not all students can afford a new car."

As with pragmatic inference generally, such inferences are defeasible or cancellable – the inferred meaning may not be true, even though the literal meaning is true. This distinguishes such inferences from entailment. They are also non-detachable. A conversational implicature is said to be non-detachable when, after the replacement of what is said with another expression with the same literal meaning, the same conversational implicature remains. This distinguishes them from conventional implicatures.

In a 2006 experiment with Greek-speaking five-year-olds' interpretation of aspectual expressions, the results revealed that children have limited success in deriving scalar implicatures from the use of aspectual verbs such as "start" (which implicates non-completion). However, the tested children succeed in deriving scalar implicatures with discrete degree modifiers such as "half" as in half finished. Their ability to spontaneously compute scalar implicatures was greater than their ability to judge the pragmatic appropriateness of scalar statements. In addition, the tested children were able to suspend scalar implicatures in environments where they were not supported.

Griceans attempt to explain these implicatures in terms of the maxim of quantity, according to which one is to be just as informative as required. The idea is that if the speaker were in a position to make the stronger statement, they would have. Since they did not, they must believe that the stronger statement is not true.

== Grammatical approach ==
The most recent linguistic debate has witnessed the emergence of a so-called grammatical approach to scalar implicature. One version of this view posits that scalar structures are associated with an obligatorily articulated exhaustivity operator, which is responsible for the derivation. Supporting arguments for this view include embeddability, that is, the possible generation of scalar implicatures in the scope of logical operators, and contextual blindness, that is, the possible generation of scalar implicatures when in conflict with contextual information, including with contextually empty domains.

== Examples ==
Some examples of scalar implicature are:

1a. Bill has got some of Chomsky's papers.
1b. The speaker believes that Bill hasn't got all of Chomsky's papers.

2a. There will be five of us for dinner tonight.
2b. There won't be more than five of us for dinner tonight.

3a. She won't necessarily get the job.
3b. She will possibly get the job.

4a. The Russians or the Americans have just landed on Mars.
4b. Not both of them have just landed on Mars.

Uttering the sentence (a) in most cases will communicate the assumption in (b). This seems to be because the speaker did not use stronger terms such as 'there will be more than five people for dinner tonight' or 'she can't possibly get the job'. For example, if Bill really did have all of Chomsky's papers, the speaker would have said so. However, according to the maxim of quantity, a speaker will only be informative as is required, and will therefore not use any stronger terms unless required. The hearer, knowing this, will assume that the stronger term does not apply.

== See also ==
- Cooperative principle
- Downward entailing
- Focus (linguistics)
- Logical consequence
- Entailment (pragmatics)
- Homogeneity (linguistics)
- Indirect speech act
- Strawson entailment
- Subtrigging
