= Hörl =

Hörl is a German surname. Notable people with the surname include:

- Arthur Hoerl (1891–1968), American screenwriter
- Christoph Hoerl (born 1967), German philosopher
- Christopher Hörl (born 1989), Austrian skier
- Jan Hörl (born 1998), Austrian ski jumper
- Josef Georg Hörl (1722–1806), Austrian lawyer and mayor of Vienna
- Ottmar Hörl (born 1950), German artist and writer
- Thomas Hörl (born 1981), Austrian ski jumper
