= Strawson entailment =

Concept in formal semantics and philosophical logic

In formal semantics, Strawson entailment is a variant of the concept of entailment which is insensitive to presupposition failures. Formally, a sentence P Strawson-entails a sentence Q iff Q is always true when P is true and Qs presuppositions are satisfied. For example, "Maria loves every cat" Strawson-entails "Maria loves her cat" because Maria could not love every cat without loving her own, assuming that she has one. This would not be an ordinary entailment, since the first sentence could be true while the second is undefined on account of a presupposition failure; loving every cat would not guarantee that she owns a cat.

Strawson entailment has played an important role in semantic theory since some natural language expressions have been argued to be sensitive to Strawson-entailment rather than pure entailment. For instance, the textbook theory of weak negative polarity items holds that they are licensed only in Strawson-downward entailing environments. Other phenomena that have been analyzed using Strawson entailment include temporal adverbials, covert reciprocals, and scalar implicature. Although the concept is widely used within formal semantics, it is not universally adopted and alternative proposals have argued both for returning to pure entailment and for generalizing the notion further to consider not-at-issue content beyond presupposition.

== See also ==
- Homogeneity (semantics)
- Law of excluded middle
- Trivalent logic
