= Affirmation and negation =

Grammatical category indicating truth or falsehood

In linguistics and grammar, affirmation (abbreviated aff) and negation (neg) are ways in which grammar encodes positive and negative polarity into verb phrases, clauses, or utterances. An affirmative (positive) form is used to express the validity or truth of a basic assertion, while a negative form expresses its falsity. For example, the affirmative sentence "Joe is here" asserts that it is true that Joe is currently located near the speaker. Conversely, the negative sentence "Joe is not here" asserts that it is not true that Joe is currently located near the speaker.

The grammatical category associated with affirmatives and negatives is called polarity. This means that a clause, sentence, verb phrase, etc. may be said to have either affirmative or negative polarity (its polarity may be either affirmative or negative). Affirmative is typically the unmarked polarity, whereas a negative statement is marked in some way. Negative polarity can be indicated by negating words or particles such as the English not, or the Japanese affix -ない -nai, or by other means, which reverses the meaning of the predicate. The process of converting affirmative to negative is called negation – the grammatical rules for negation vary from language to language, and a given language may have multiple methods of negation.

Affirmative and negative responses (specifically, though not exclusively, to questions) are often expressed using particles or words such as yes and no, where yes is the affirmative, or positive particle, and no is the negation, or negative particle.

== Basis for affirmation and negation ==
Affirmation and negation are crucial building blocks for language. The presence of negation is the absence of affirmation, where affirmation functions individually. There are three main aspects to the concept of affirmation and negation; Cognitive, psychological and philosophical (Schopenhauer's theory or Nietzschean affirmation).

=== Cognitive ===
Negation in English is more difficult for the brain to process as it works in opposition to affirmation. If affirmation and negation were missing from language people would only be able to communicate through possibilities. The recent Reusing Inhibition for Negation (RIN) hypothesis states that there is a specific inhibitory control mechanism (one that is reused) that is needed when trying to understand negation in sentences.

== Affirmation ==
=== Meaning of affirmation ===
Affirmations or positive polarity items (PPIs) are expressions that are rejected by negation, usually escaping the scope of negation. PPIs in the literature have been associated with speaker-oriented adverbs, as well as expressions similar to some, already, and would rather. Affirmative sentences work in opposition to negations. The affirmative, in an English example such as "the police chief here is a woman", declares a simple fact; in this case, a fact regarding the police chief, asserting that she is a woman. In contrast, the negative, in an English example such as "the police chief here is not a man", is stated as an assumption for people to believe. It is also widely believed that the affirmative is the unmarked base form from which the negative is produced, but this can be argued when coming from a pragmatic standpoint. Pragmatically, affirmatives can sometimes derive the pragmatically unmarked form, or, at times, create novel affirmative derivatives.

Affirmation can also be compared to the notion of assertiveness.

=== Affirmation in English ===
Affirmation can be indicated with the following words in English: some, certainly, already, and would rather. Two examples of affirmation include (1) John is here already and (2) I am a moral person. These two sentences are truth statements, and serve as a representation of affirmation in English. The negated versions can be formed as the statements (1_{NEG}) John is not here already and (2_{NEG}) I am not a moral person.

(1)

a. John is here already (affirmative)
b. John might be here already (modal)
c. John is not here already (negative)
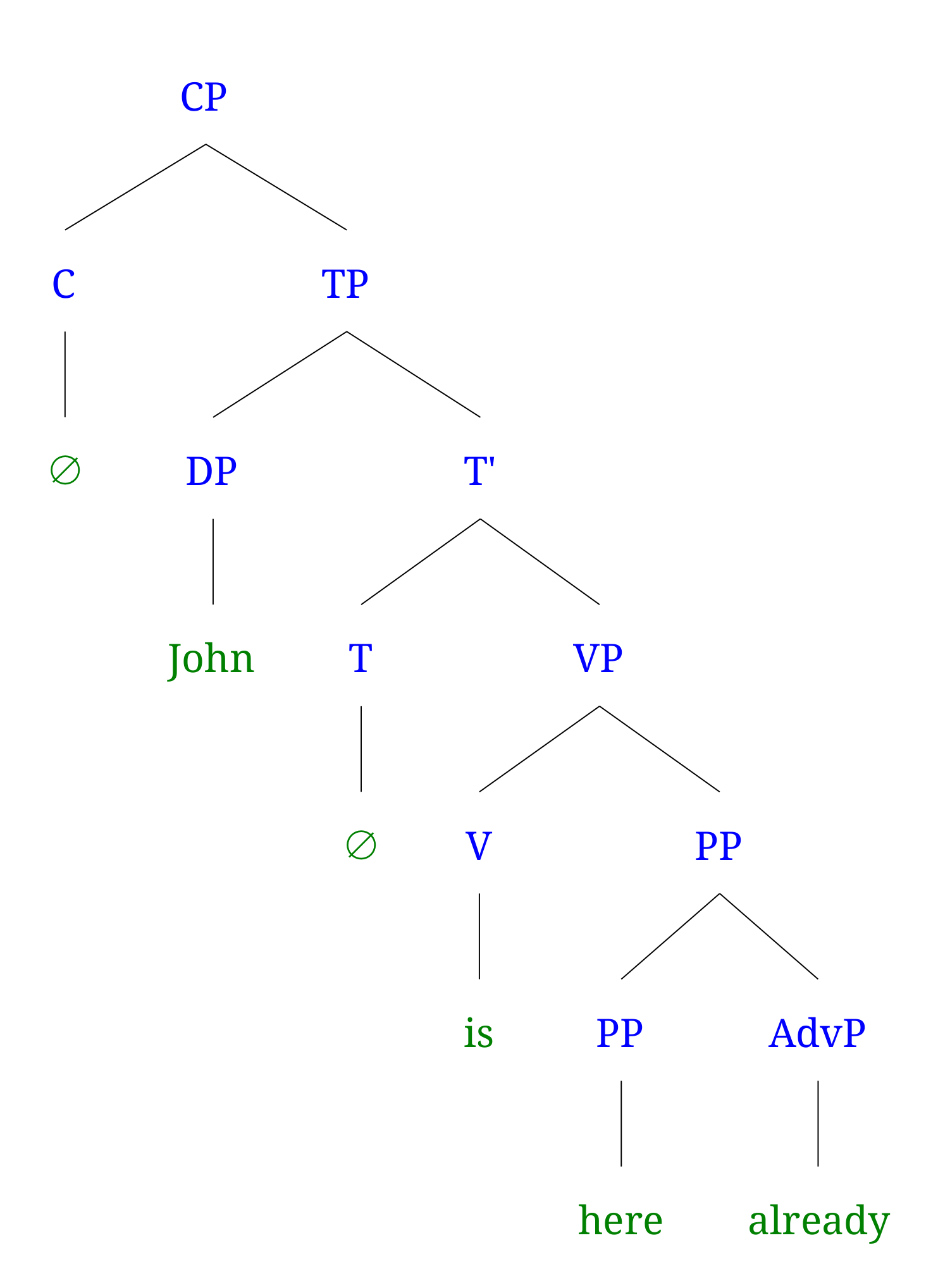
Syntax tree of (1a) John is here already (affirmative)

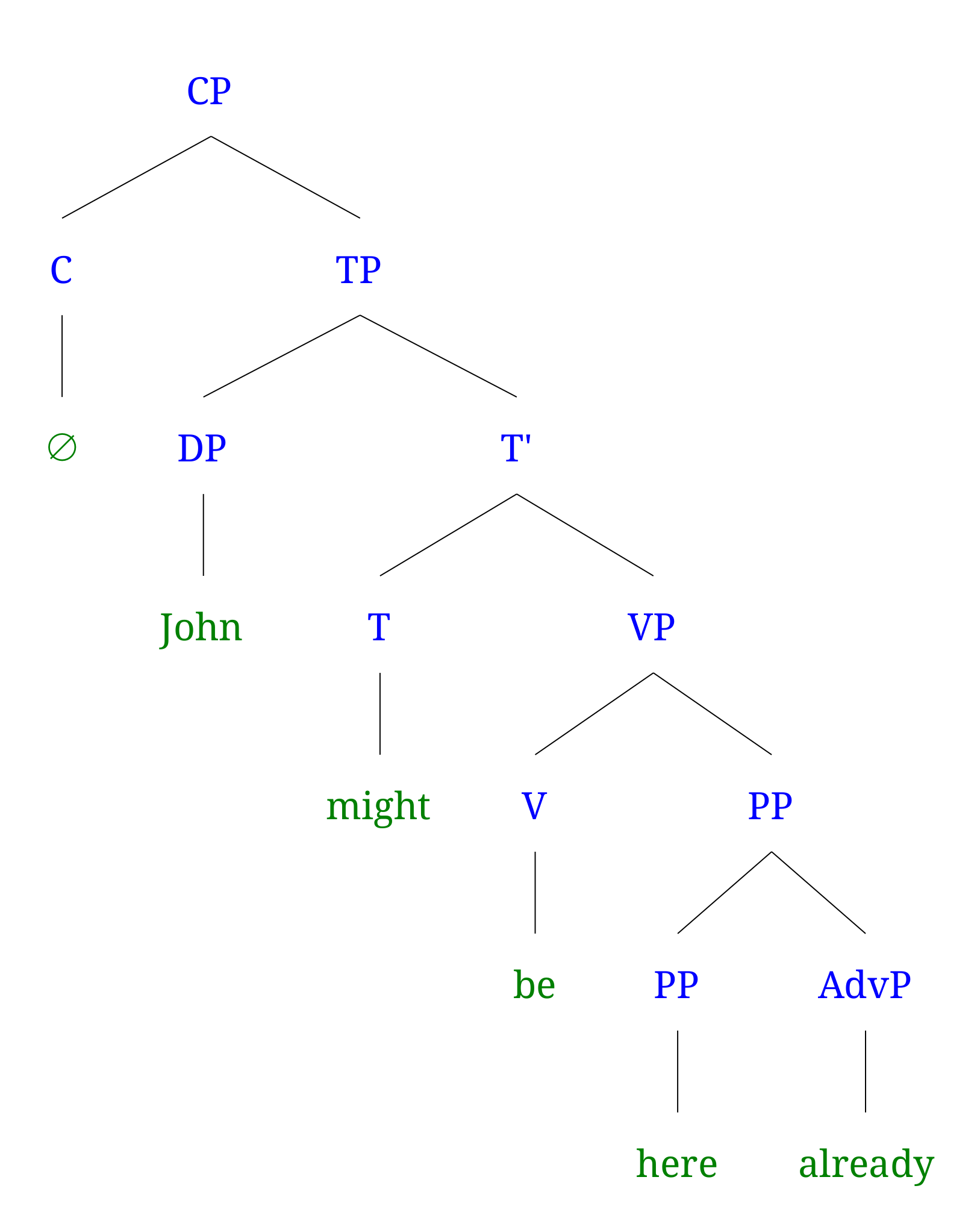
Syntax tree of (1b) John might be here already (modal)

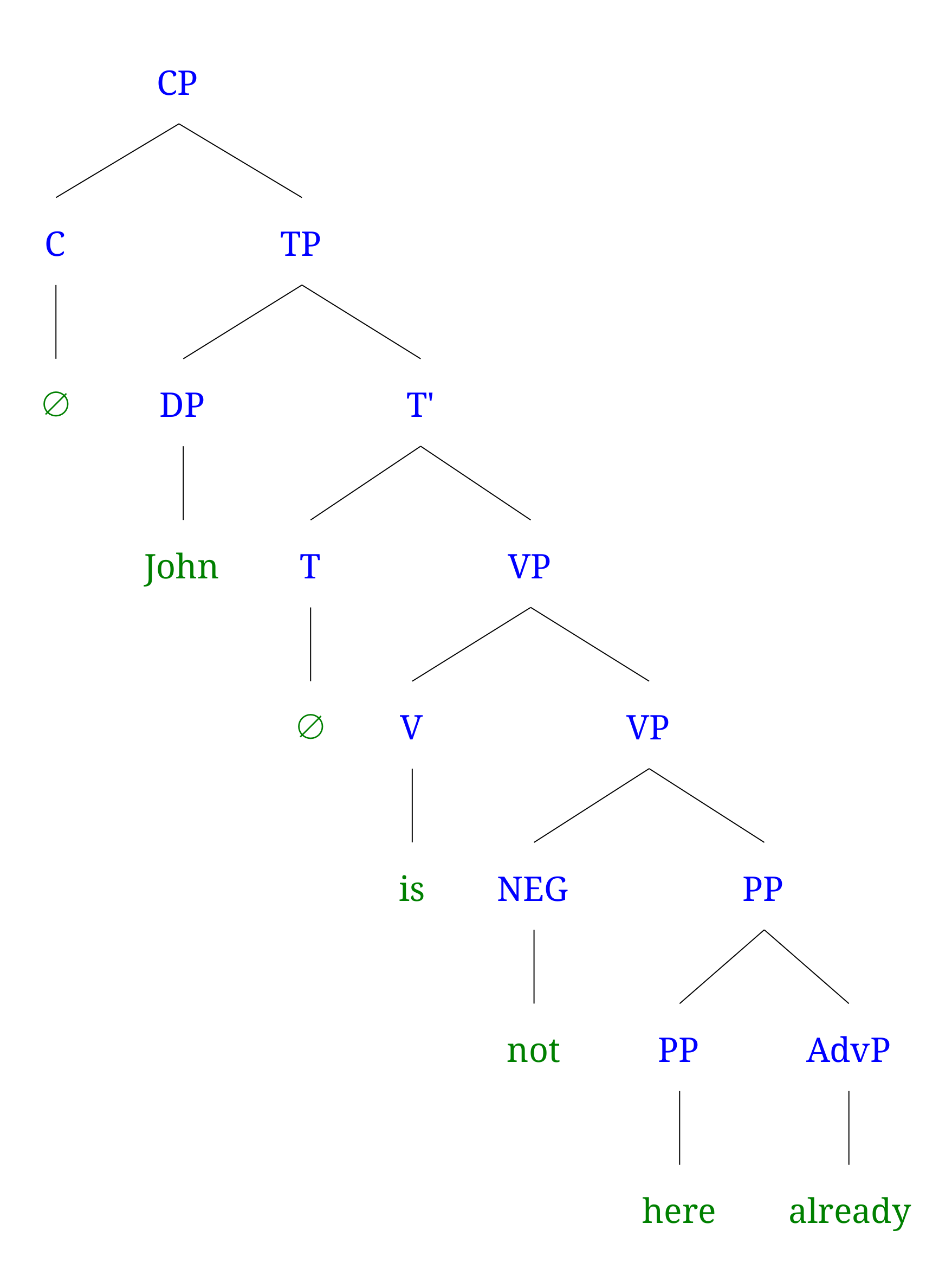
Syntax tree of (1c) John is not here already (negative)

(2)

a. I am a moral person (affirmative)
b. I might be a moral person (modal)
c. I am not a moral person (negative)
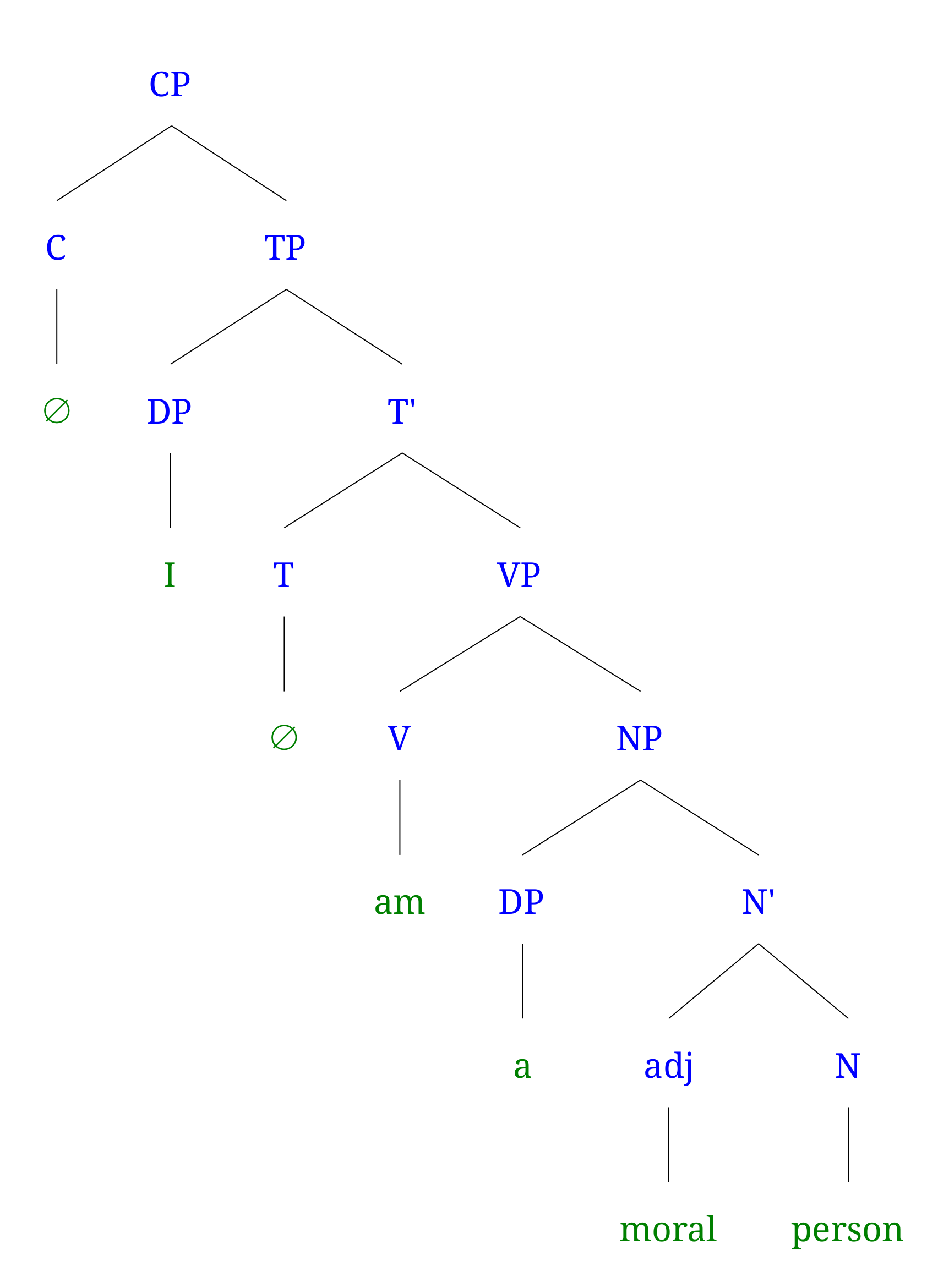
Syntax tree of (2a) I am a moral person (affirmative)

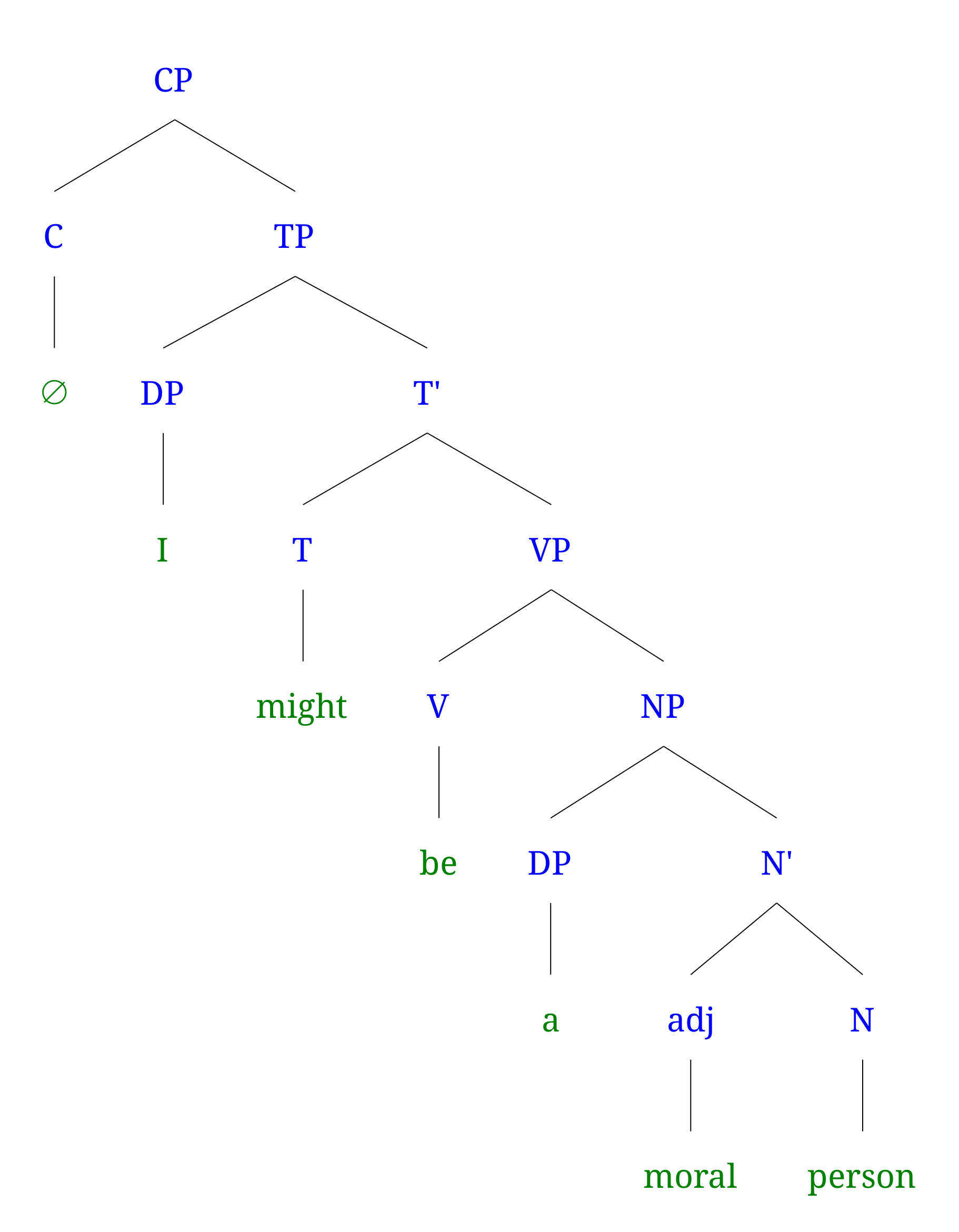
Syntax tree of (2b) I might be a moral person (modal)

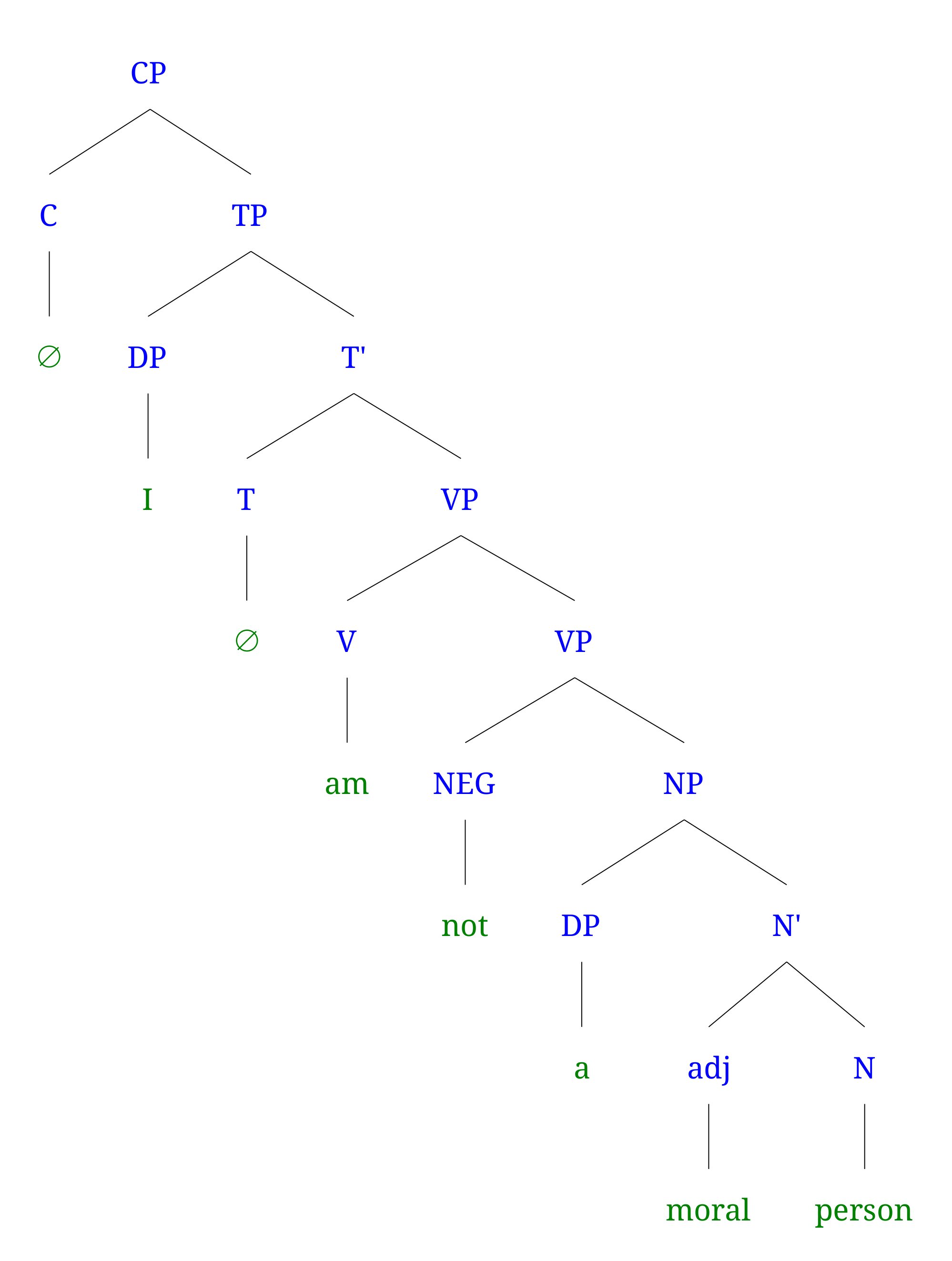
Syntax tree of (2c) I am not a moral person (negative)

=== Affirmation in other languages ===
==== Dagaare ====
In Dagaare, there are verbal suffixes, such as -ng, that serve as an affirmation or an emphasis to a verbal action. These verbal suffixes are also known as a focus particle or a factitive marker.

(3) ò kyɛ́ng-ɛ́ɛ́-ńg (affirmative)
"S/he has walked"

There are also cases of the identifying pronoun na developing into an affirmative marker. na is reanalyzed into a clause final particle simultaneously with the denominalisation of the clausal subject which brings the result of na as a clause nominalising particle which can again be reanalyzed as a positive, future, marker. This clause final particle is known to only be used to mark assertiveness in positive clauses because it is not seen co-occurring with negative markers.

(4) ɭ̃ na cen na (affirmative)
"I will go"

== Negation ==
=== Meaning of negation ===
Simple grammatical negation of a clause, in principle, has the effect of converting a proposition to its logical negation. This is done by replacing an assertion that something is the case with an assertion that it is not the case.

In some cases, however, particularly when a particular modality is expressed, the semantic effect of negation may be somewhat different. For example, in English, the meaning of "you must not go" is not the exact negation of "you must go". The exact negation of this phrase would be expressed as "you don't have to go" or "you needn't go". The negation "must not" has a stronger meaning (the effect is to apply the logical negation to the following infinitive rather than applying it to the full clause with must). For more details and other similar cases, see the relevant sections of English modal verbs.

Negation flips downward entailing and upward entailing statements within the scope of the negation. For example, changing "one could have seen anything" to "no one could have seen anything" changes the meaning of the last word from "anything" to "nothing".

In some cases, by way of irony, an affirmative statement may be intended to have the meaning of the corresponding negative, or vice versa. For examples see antiphrasis and sarcasm.

For the use of double negations or similar as understatements ("not unappealing", "not bad", etc.) see litotes.

=== Grammatical rules for negation ===
==== Simple negation of verbs and clauses ====
Languages have a variety of grammatical rules for converting affirmative verb phrases or clauses into negative ones.

In many languages, an affirmative is made negative by the addition of a particle, meaning "not". This may be added before the verb phrase, as with the Spanish no:

(5)

a. Está en casa (affirmative)
"(S)he is at home"
b. No está en casa (negative)
"(S)he is not at home"

Other examples of negating particles preceding the verb phrase include Italian non, Russian не nye and Polish nie; they can also be found in constructed languages: ne in Esperanto and non in Interlingua. In some other languages the negating particle follows the verb or verb phrase, as in Dutch:

(6)

a. Ik zie hem (affirmative)
"I see him"
b. Ik zie hem niet (negative)
"I do not see him"

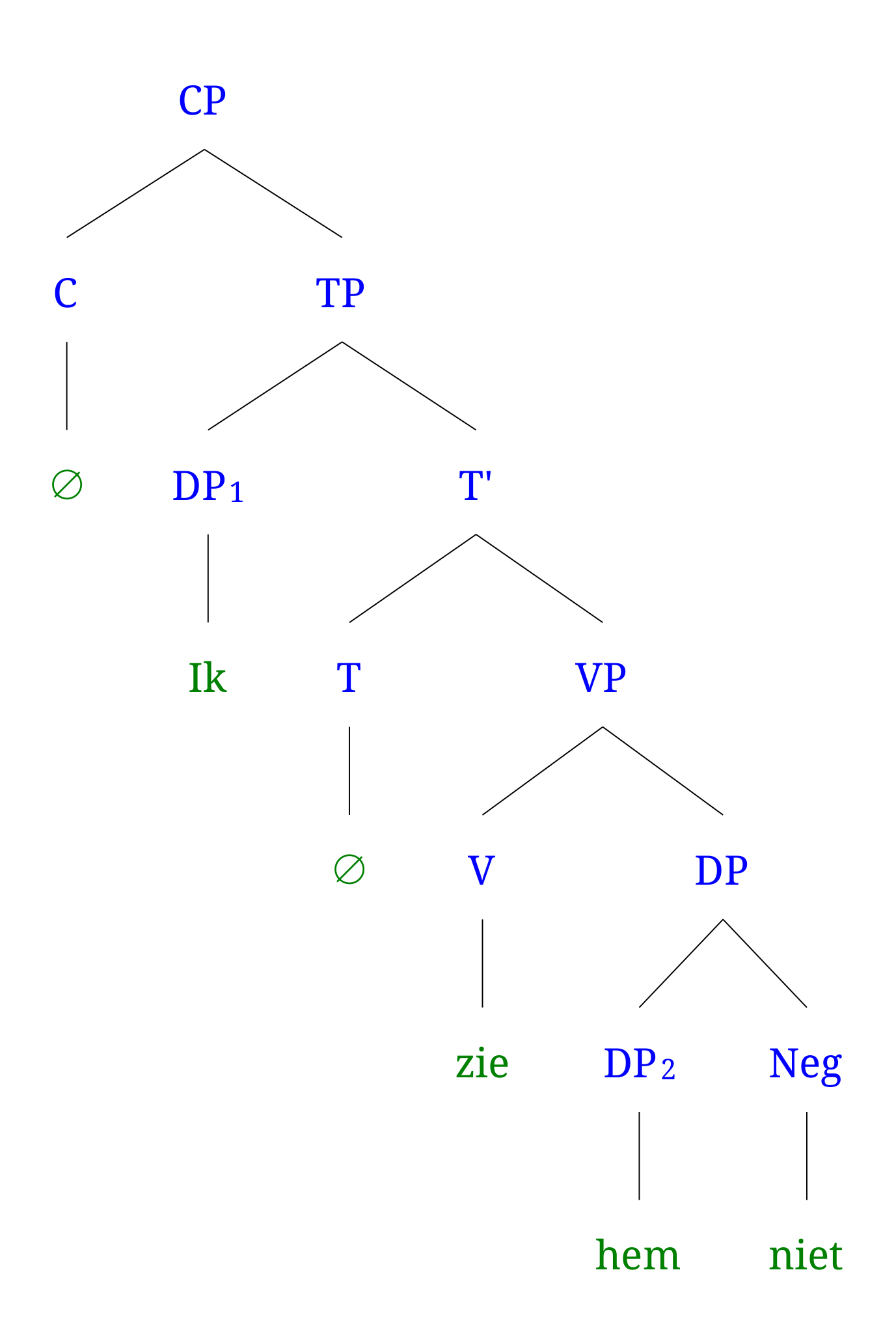
Syntax tree for (6b) Ik zie hem niet (negative)

Particles following the verb in this way include not in archaic and dialectal English ("you remember not"), nicht in German (ich schlafe nicht, "I am not sleeping"), and inte in Swedish (han hoppade inte, "he did not jump").

In French, particles are added both before (ne) and after the verb phrase (pas):

(7)

a. Je sais (affirmative)
"I know"
b. Je (ne) sais pas (negative)
"I don't know"

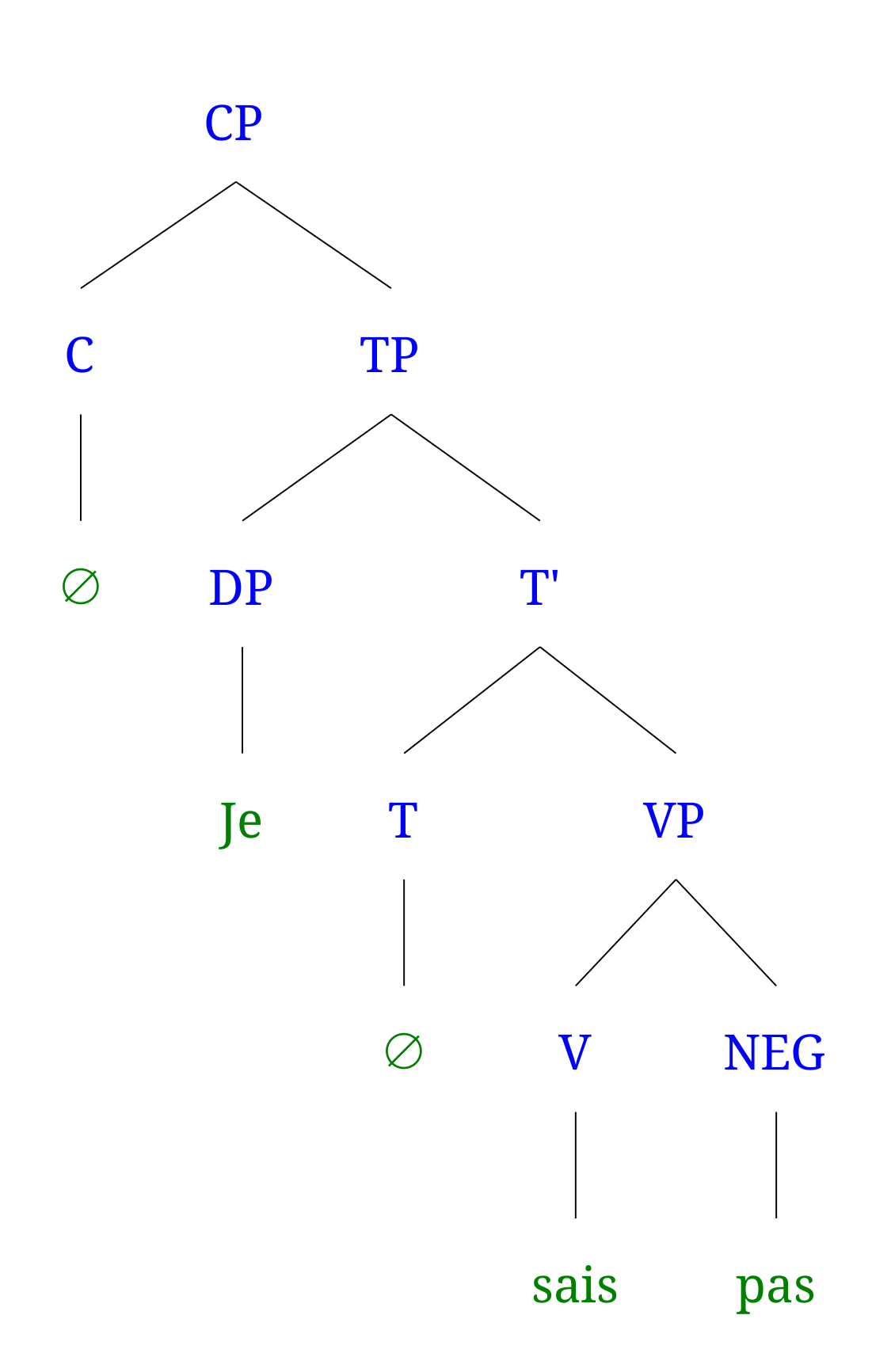
Syntax tree for (7b) Je sais pas (negative)

However, in colloquial French the first particle is often omitted: Je sais pas. Similar use of two negating particles can also be found in Afrikaans: Hy kan nie Afrikaans praat nie ("He cannot speak Afrikaans").

In English, negation is achieved by adding not after the verb. As a practical matter, Modern English typically uses a copula verb (a form of be) or an auxiliary verb with not. If no other auxiliary verb is present, then dummy auxiliary do (does, did) is normally introduced – see do-support. For example,

(8)

a. I have gone (affirmative)
b. I have not gone (negative; have is the auxiliary)

(9)

a. He goes (affirmative)
b. #He goes not (negative)

but that wording is considered archaic and is rarely used. It is much more common to use the dummy auxiliary to render

c. He does not go

(since there is no auxiliary in the original sentence).

Different rules apply in subjunctive, imperative and non-finite clauses. For more details see English grammar § Negation. (In Middle English, the particle not could follow any verb, e.g. "I see not the horse.")

In some languages, like Welsh, verbs have special inflections to be used in negative clauses. (In some language families, this may lead to reference to a negative mood.) An example is Japanese, which conjugates verbs in the negative after adding the suffix -ない -nai (indicating negation); e.g., 食べる taberu ("eat") and 食べない tabenai ("do not eat"). It could be argued that English has joined the ranks of these languages, since negation requires the use of an auxiliary verb and a distinct syntax in most cases; the form of the basic verb can change on negation, as in "he sings" vs. "he doesn't sing". Zwicky and Pullum have shown that n't is an inflectional suffix, not a clitic or a derivational suffix.

Complex rules for negation also apply in Finnish; see Finnish grammar § Negation of verbs. In some languages negation may also affect the dependents of the verb; for example in some Slavic languages, such as Polish, the case of a direct object often changes from accusative to genitive when the verb is negated.

==== Negation of other elements ====
Negation can be applied not just to whole verb phrases, clauses or sentences, but also to specific elements (such as adjectives and noun phrases) within sentences. (Note: The linguist D. Biber refers to two types of negation, synthetic ('no', 'neither' or 'nor' negation) and analytic ('not' negation). For example, "He is neither here nor there" (synthetic) or "He is not here" (analytic).) This contrast is usually labeled sentential negation versus constituent negation. Ways in which this constituent negation is realized depends on the grammar of the language in question. English generally places not before the negated element, as in "I witnessed not a debate, but a war." There are also negating affixes, such as the English prefixes non-, un-, in-, etc. Such elements are called privatives.

==== Multiple negation ====
There also exist elements which carry a specialized negative meaning, including pronouns such as nobody, none and nothing, determiners such as no (as in "no apples"), and adverbs such as never, no longer and nowhere.

Although such elements themselves have negative force, in some languages a clause in which they appear is additionally marked for ordinary negation. For example, in Russian, "I see nobody" is expressed as я никого не вижу ja nikovo nye vizhu, literally "I nobody not see" – the ordinary negating particle не nye ("not") is used in addition to the negative pronoun никого nikovo ("nobody"). Italian behaves in a similar way: Non ti vede nessuno ("nobody can see you"), although Nessuno ti vede is also a possible clause with exactly the same meaning.

=== The negative in other languages ===
==== Russian ====
In Russian, all of the elements ("not", "never", "nobody", "nowhere") appear together in the sentence in their negative form.

==== Italian ====
In Italian, a clause works much as in Russian, but non does not have to be there, and can be there only before the verb if it precedes all other negative elements: Tu non porti mai nessuno da nessuna parte. "Nobody ever brings you anything here", however, could be translated Nessuno qui ti porta mai niente or Qui non ti porta mai niente nessuno.

==== French ====
In French, where simple negation is performed using ne ... pas (see above), specialized negatives appear in combination with the first particle (ne), replacing the second (pas):

(10)

a. Je ne bois jamais ("I never drink")
b. Je ne vois personne ("I see nobody")
c. Je n'ai jamais vu personne ("I have never seen anybody")

==== Ancient Greek ====
In Ancient Greek, a simple negative (οὐ ou "not" or μή mḗ "not (modal)") following another simple or compound negative (e.g., οὐδείς oudeís "nobody") results in an affirmation, whereas a compound negative following a simple or compound negative strengthens the negation:

- οὐδεὶς οὐκ ἔπασχέ τι oudeìs ouk épaskhé ti, "nobody was not suffering something", meaning "everybody was suffering"
- μὴ θορυβήσῃ μηδείς mḕ thorubḗsēi mēdeís, "let (not) nobody raise an uproar", meaning "let nobody raise an uproar"

==== Dagaare ====
In Dagaare, negation is marked specifically by pre-verb particles, where only four, out of the nearly 24 pre-verb particles, are designated as negation markers. The four negation markers are ba, kʊ̀ŋ, ta, and tɔ́ɔ́. To signal negation, as well as other semantic relation, these negation particles combine with different aspects of the verb. These pre-verb negatory particles can also be used to convey tense, mood, aspect, and polarity (negation), and in some cases can be used to convey more than one of these features.

For example, the negation marker ta can be used to indicate polarity and mood:

- Ta zo! (Do not run!), indicates negative imperative construction

For example, the negation marker ba can be used as a non-future, or present tense, negative marker:

- a mɔnaabʊ ba kʊ a naŋkpaana (The buffalo has not killed the hunter), has ba used with the perfective A and imperfective A forms of the verb to indicate negation in the present tense

==== Sign Languages ====
Various signed and manual languages are known to negate via headshake.

== Affirmative and negative responses ==
Special affirmative and negative words (particles) are often found in responses to questions, and sometimes to other assertions by way of agreement or disagreement. In English, these are yes and no respectively; in French, oui, si, and non; in Danish ja, jo and nej; in Spanish, sí and no; and so on. Not all languages make such common use of particles of this type; in some, such as Welsh, it is more common to repeat the verb or another part of the predicate, with or without negation accordingly.

Complications sometimes arise in the case of responses to negative statements or questions; in some cases the response that confirms a negative statement is the negative particle (as in English: "You're not going out? No."), but in some languages this is reversed. Some languages have a distinct form to answer a negative question, such as French si and Danish jo (these serve to contradict the negative statement suggested by the first speaker).

== See also ==
- De Interpretatione
- Jespersen's Cycle
- Negative raising
- Not!
- Polarity item
- Veridicality
