= Exhaustivity =

Semantic interpretations of language

In linguistics, exhaustivity is the phenomenon where a proposition can be strengthened with the negation of certain alternatives. For example, in response to the question "Which students got an A?", the utterance "Ava got an A" has an exhaustive interpretation when it conveys that no other students got an A. It has a non-exhaustive interpretation when it merely conveys that Ava was among the students who got an A.

Exhaustivity is a major topic in the linguistic subfields of semantics and pragmatics. Research on the topic aims to explain when and why expressions receive exhaustive interpretations. Particular factors include focus, disjunction, questions, and polarity items. A major theoretical issue is whether exhaustivity is a semantic entailment encoded in the grammar, a pragmatic implicature arising from Gricean social cognition, or some combination of the two.

== See also ==
- Alternative semantics
- Focus
- Free choice inference
- Scalar implicature

== Bibliography ==
- Chierchia, Gennaro (2004). "Scalar implicature, polarity phenomena, and the syntax/pragmatics interface". In Belleti, Adriana (ed.). Structures and Beyond. Oxford University Press. pp. 39–103.
- Chierchia, Gennaro (2013). Logic in grammar: Polarity, Free choice, and Intervention. Oxford University Press.
- Chierchia, Gennaro; Fox, Danny; Spector, Benjamin (2012). "Scalar implicature as a grammatical phenomenon". In von Heusinger, Klaus; Maienborn, Claudia; Portner, Paul (eds.). Handbook of semantics. Vol. 3. Mouten de Gruyter. pp. 2297–2331. Archived from the original on April 5, 2022.
- Fox, Danny (2007). "Free choice and the theory of scalar implicatures". In Sauerland, Uli; Stateva, Penka (eds.). Presupposition and implicature in compositional semantics. New York: Palgrave Macmillan. pp. 537–586. doi:10.1093/jos/10.4.269.
- Grice, H.P. (1975). "Logic and Conversation". In Cole, P.; Morgan, J. (eds.). Syntax and Semantics. Vol. 3.
- Karttunen, L.; Peters, S. (1979). "Conventional implicature". In Oh, C.-K.; Dinneen, D. A. (eds.). Presupposition. New York: Academic Press.
- Krifka, Manfred (1993). "Focus and presupposition in dynamic interpretation". Journal of Semantics. 10 (4): 269–300. doi:10.1093/jos/10.4.269.
- Krifka, Manfred (1995). "The semantics and pragmatics of polarity items". Linguistic Analysis. 24: 209=257.
- Rooth, Mats (1992). "A theory of focus interpretation". Natural Language Semantics. 1 (1): 75–116. doi:10.1007/BF02342617. S2CID 14108349.
- Rooth, Mats (2016). "Alternative semantics". In Féry, Caroline; Ishihara, Shinichiro (eds.). The Oxford Handbook of Information Structure. Oxford University Press. doi:10.1093/oxfordhb/9780199642670.013.19.
- Spector, Benjamin (2016). "Comparing exhaustivity operators". Semantics and Pragmatics. 9 (11): 1–13. doi:10.3765/sp.9.11.
