= Minimizer =

Word or phrase used to reinforce negation

In linguistics, a minimizer is a word or phrase that denotes a very small quantity which is used to reinforce negation. For example, in the sentence "I'm not paying him a red cent", red cent is a minimizer which means "I'm not paying him any money".

Minimizers are usually analysed as a subclass of negative polarity items, and are often limited to negative contexts. For example, statements like "I paid him a red cent" or "I care a whit" would be considered unacceptable. In English and other languages, minimizers constitute the largest and most productive class of negative polarity items.

== History ==
The term minimizer was coined by linguist Dwight Bolinger in his 1972 book Degree Words, where he described them as "partially stereotyped equivalents of any". The phenomenon had previously been remarked upon by other scholars as far back as August Friedrich Pott in 1859.

Quirk et al. use the term in their 1985 A Comprehensive Grammar of the English Language, classifying minimizers as a subclass of "downtoners" (alongside "approximators", "compromisers", and "diminishers"). Unusually, they include in this category adverbs like barely and hardly which themselves encode negation.

== Polarity ==
Minimizers are usually treated as a kind of negative polarity item, though this point of view has been challenged. Under negation, the minimizer is interpreted metaphorically as the absence of even a minimal quantity – i.e. nothing at all.

Like other negative polarity items, minimizers can, in addition to negative contexts, also occur in other non-affirmative contexts such as questions and conditionals, as in:

Do you have a drop of water to spare?
If you tell a soul, your career is over.

=== Positive contexts ===
Some minimizers cannot be used in affirmative contexts (except perhaps for deliberate comedic effect), for example:

* I slept a wink last night.
* I give a hoot about your poem.

Other terms used as minimizers may simply refer literally to a small fixed quantity when used in positive contexts, such as:

I paid him a dime.
She said a word.

== Range of meanings and origins ==
Minimizers are a highly productive class, and new examples can be readily formed from a variety of domains. Early surveys of minimizers across a range of living and dead languages found that some recurring categories included:

- Small items of food (e.g. a cherrystone, an egg, a fig, a grain, a parsnip)
- Coins of little value (e.g. a dinero, a sou, a dime)
- Animal and body parts (e.g. a cat's tail, a hair, a sparrow)
- Other miscellaneous objects of little value or relevance (e.g. a pinecone, a shred, a nail)

Another category of minimizers is superlative expressions such as "the foggiest idea" or "the slightest inkling".

Some minimizers are limited to very specific, fixed idiomatic verb phrases (e.g. "move a muscle", "lift a finger", "sleep a wink"), whereas others are highly versatile, such as the semantically bleached shit:

I'm not paying him shit.
I'm not saying shit without a lawyer present.
You can search my car, but you're not going to find shit.

Other minimizers are limited to representing only a certain kind of quantity. For example, word may only be used with predicates which take an object of a linguistic nature:

She didn't speak a word.
I don't believe a word of your story.
I can't understand a word of Italian.
# He doesn't care a word about his colleagues.

(The # symbol marks the last sentence as infelicitous.)

== Role in language change ==
Minimizers are one linguistic element which may develop over time into a marker of sentential negation. For example, negation in French is usually marked with the pre-verbal particle ne and the negative marker pas, as in Je ne sais pas ("I don't know"). pas derives from the Latin passum ("step"), hence "ne... pas" derives from a construction meaning "not a step". In early French, pas could be interchanged with other minimizer nouns such as goutte ("drop") or mie ("crumb"). Similar developments have occurred in other Romance languages. In this way, minimizers have been implicated in Jespersen's cycle, in that a language with pre-verbal negation may develop toward obligatory pre- and post-verbal negation by the grammaticalization of a minimizer which initially is used optionally for emphasis or some other pragmatic purpose.

== Vulgar minimizers ==
A particular class of English minimizers based on vulgar or profane language have been observed to have a distinctive property. Like other minimizers, they can appear in non-affirmative contexts with a meaning of "anything", but they can also be used in affirmative contexts, where they seem to take on the meaning "nothing". For example, the following pair of sentences have identical meanings:

He doesn't know jack shit about politics.
He knows jack shit about politics.

Other English examples in this category (which Paul Postal gives the label "SQUAT") include dick, diddley-squat, fuck-all, and shit. The same phenomenon has been observed for some vulgarisms in Catalan (e.g. una merda, "a shit"; un carall, "a penis") and Spanish (e.g. tres cojones, "three testicles"; un mojón, "a turd").

Some uses of vulgar intensifiers serve the same semantic function as minimizers, as for example in the statement, "I'm not paying him a frickin cent" (compare "I'm not paying him a red cent").

== See also ==
- Article (grammar) § partitive articles
- English articles § some and any
- Determiners
- Double negative (multiple negation) for intensity (e.g., I'm not payin him nothin) (standard in some languages; nonstandard in English)
