= ESPP =

ESPP may refer to:

- Employee stock purchase plan
- The European Society for Philosophy and Psychology, a professional organization of philosophers and cognitive scientists
- Euclidean shortest path problem in computer science; finding a route between two points while avoiding obstacles
- European Sustainable Phosphorus Platform
