= Naomi Eilan =

British philosopher

Education
- Education: Oxford (DPhil)
- Thesis: Self-consciousness and experience (1988)

Philosophical work
- Era: 21st-century philosophy
- Region: Western philosophy
- School: Analytic
- Institutions: University of Warwick
- Main interests: Consciousness, philosophy of mind, metaphysics, philosophy of psychology

Naomi Eilan is a philosopher and professor of philosophy at the University of Warwick, whose works concern consciousness, philosophy of mind, metaphysics and philosophy of psychology.

Eilan completed her doctorate at the University of Oxford in 1988, with the dissertation Self-consciousness and experience. She was president of the European Society for Philosophy and Psychology for 2010 to 2014.

== Books ==
- Spatial Representation: Problems in Philosophy and Psychology. Blackwell, 1993, and Oxford University Press, 1999. Edited with Rosalee McCarthy and Bill Brewer.
- The Body and the Self. MIT Press, 1995. Edited with José Luis Bermúdez and Anthony Marcel.
- Agency and Self Awareness: Issues in Philosophy and Psychology. Oxford University Press, 2003. Edited with Johannes Roessler.
- Joint Attention: Communication and Other Minds. Oxford University Press, 2005. Edited with Christoph Hoerl, Teresa McCormack and Johannes Roessler.
- Perception, Causation, & Objectivity. Oxford University Press, 2011. Edited with Johannes Roessler and Hemdat Lerman.
