= Hoeksema =

Hoeksema is a surname. Notable people with the surname include:

- Herman Hoeksema (1886–1965), Dutch Reformed theologian
- Jack Hoeksema (born 1956), Dutch linguist
- Timothy E. Hoeksema (born 1947), American businessman

== See also ==
- Susan Nolen-Hoeksema (1959–2013), American psychologist
- Ilona Hoeksma (born 1991), Dutch cyclist
