= Heidegger and the Place of Ethics =

2005 book by Michael Lewis

Heidegger and the Place of Ethics: Being-with in the Crossing of Heidegger's Thought
- Author: Michael Lewis
- Language: English
- Subject: Continental philosophy
- Published: 2005
- Publisher: Bloomsbury Publishing
- Media type: Print
- Pages: 232 pp.
- ISBN: 9781847143266

Heidegger and the Place of Ethics: Being-with in the Crossing of Heidegger's Thought is a 2005 book by British philosopher Michael Lewis in which the author examines Heideggerian ethics with a focus on the concept being-with and revisits the relationship between ethics and politics in Heidegger's thought which can be seen in his engagement with Nazism.
