= Fabienne Peter =

British philosopher

Education
- Education: University of St. Gallen (PhD)

Philosophical work
- Era: 21st-century philosophy
- Region: Western philosophy
- School: Analytic
- Institutions: University of Warwick
- Main interests: Political Philosophy, Moral philosophy, Epistemology

Fabienne Peter is a professor of philosophy at the University of Warwick. She is a former head of the Department of Philosophy (2017-2020); succeeded by current head, Guy Longworth. Peter has held a Leverhulme Research Fellowship and is known for her works on political philosophy, moral philosophy, and social epistemology. She is a former editor of Economics and Philosophy and a former associate editor of the Journal of Applied Philosophy.

== Books ==
- Democratic Legitimacy, Routledge, 2008
- Rationality and Commitment, edited with Hans Bernhard Schmid, Oxford University Press, 2007
- Public Health, Ethics, and Equity, edited with Sudhir Anand and Amartya Sen, Oxford University Press, 2004
