= John Mullarkey =

British academic

John Mullarkey is the Professor in Film and Television at Kingston University, London, and a member of The London Graduate School.

Mullarkey's work explores variations of "non-standard-philosophy", arguing that philosophy is a subject that continually shifts its identity through engaging with (supposedly) "non-philosophical" fields such as film. Mullarkey's work notably engages with that of François Laruelle and Henri Bergson.

He is an editor of the journal Film-Philosophy, and chair of the Society for European Philosophy.

== Select bibliography ==
- Mullarkey, John and Lord, Beth, eds. (2013) The Bloomsbury Companion to Continental Philosophy. London, U.K. : Bloomsbury. 432p. (Bloomsbury Companions) ISBN 9781441131997
- Mullarkey, John and Smith, Anthony Paul, eds. (2012) Laruelle and non-philosophy. Edinburgh, U.K. : Edinburgh University Press. 272p. (Critical Connections) ISBN 9780748645350
- Mullarkey, John (2009) Refractions of reality: philosophy and the moving image. Basingstoke, U.K. : Palgrave-Macmillan. 282p. ISBN 9780230002470
- Mullarkey, John (2006) Post-Continental Philosophy: An Outline. London, U.K. : Continuum. 272p. (Transversals: New Directions in Philosophy) ISBN 9780826464620
- Ansell Pearson, Keith and Mullarkey, John, eds. (2002) Henri Bergson: key writings. London, U.K. : Continuum. 402p. (Athlone Contemporary European Thinkers) ISBN 9780826457295
- Mullarkey, John (2000) Bergson and Philosophy. Notre Dame, U.S.A. : University of Notre Dame Press. 224p. ISBN 0268021619
