= Derrida and Lacan: Another Writing =

2008 book by British philosopher Michael Lewis

- Author: Michael Lewis
- Language: English
- Subject: Continental philosophy
- Published: 2008
- Publisher: Edinburgh University Press
- Media type: Print
- Pages: 296 pp.
- ISBN: 978-0748636037

Derrida and Lacan: Another Writing is a 2008 book by British philosopher Michael Lewis in which the author "argues that Jacques Derrida's philosophical understanding of language should be supplemented by Jacques Lacan's psychoanalytic approach to the symbolic order."
