= Beth Lord =

Canadian philosopher (born 1976)

- Born: 1976 (age 49–50)

Education
- Education: University of Warwick

Philosophical work
- Era: Contemporary philosophy
- Region: Western philosophy
- School: Continental philosophy
- Institutions: University of Dundee; University of Aberdeen
- Main interests: History of philosophy, Baruch Spinoza, Immanuel Kant

Beth Lord (born 1976) is a Canadian philosopher specialising in the history of philosophy, especially the work and influence of Immanuel Kant and Baruch Spinoza, and contemporary Continental philosophy. She is currently a Professor and Head of School in the School of Divinity, History and Philosophy at the University of Aberdeen, where she has worked since 2013.

== Education and career ==
Lord was raised in Ontario, and initially studied at the University of Toronto. She intended to study drama, but graduated with a degree in Philosophy and Literary Studies. She went on to the University of Warwick, where she read for an MA in Continental Philosophy and then a doctorate. Her doctoral thesis, which was supervised initially by Andrew Benjamin and then by Stephen Houlgate, was entitled Kant's Productive Ontology: Knowledge, Nature and the Meaning of Being. In the thesis, Lord argues that Kant's ontology is a "productive ontology"; i.e., a theory which rests upon an idea of production. Lord completed her doctorate in 2004. In the same year, she started a permanent position in the philosophy department at the University of Dundee.

In 2010, with funding from the Arts and Humanities Research Council (AHRC), Lord founded the Spinoza Research Network, of which she remains the director. In the same year, she published Spinoza's Ethics: An Edinburgh Philosophical Guide (Edinburgh University Press), a study aid for Spinoza's Ethics (1677). The following year, she published Kant and Spinozism: Transcendental Idealism and Immanence from Jacobi to Deleuze (Palgrave Macmillan), in which she examined the work of Johann Gottfried Herder, Friedrich Heinrich Jacobi, Salomon Maimon and Gilles Deleuze, all of whom, she argues, drew upon both Kant's transcendental idealism and Spinoza's immanence. For Lord, Spinoza's thought is key to understanding the influence of Kantian ideas. In addition to publishing these books, Lord co-edited The Continuum Companion to Continental Philosophy (Continuum, 2010, later republished as The Bloomsbury Companion to Continental Philosophy) with John Ó Maoilearca and was the sole editor of Spinoza Beyond Philosophy (Edinburgh University Press, 2012).

Lord left Dundee in 2012, starting at the University of Aberdeen in January 2013, where she led the AHRC-funded Equalities of Wellbeing project. As of 2019, she is a professor in the School of Divinity, History and Philosophy at Aberdeen, and is serving as the secretary of the British Society for the History of Philosophy and the chair of the Society for European Philosophy.

In the spring of 2023, as the Head of School of Divinity, History, Philosophy, and Art History at the University of Aberdeen, Lord violated UK GDPR legislation in an attempt to track and mitigate trade union activities within the school.

== Select bibliography ==
- Mullarkey, John, and Beth Lord, eds. (2009). The Continuum Companion to Continental Philosophy. London: Continuum.
- Lord, Beth (2010). Spinoza's Ethics: An Edinburgh Philosophical Guide. Edinburgh: Edinburgh University Press.
- Lord, Beth (2011). Kant and Spinozism: Transcendental Idealism and Immanence from Jacobi to Deleuze. Basingstoke: Palgrave Macmillan.
- Lord, Beth, ed. (2012). Spinoza Beyond Philosophy. Edinburgh: Edinburgh University Press.
