= Keith W. Faulkner =

British academic

Keith Wylie Faulkner (born 1972) is a British academic specializing in the work of Gilles Deleuze. He received his Ph.D. in philosophy from the University of Warwick, UK. He is known for authoring Deleuze and the Three Syntheses of Time on Deleuze's theory of time, which he calls the most important theory of time since Heidegger.

== Reception ==
According to Ansell-Pearson Faulkner's "treatment of Deleuze’s three syntheses of time provides the analytical depth and intellectual profundity lacking in existing accounts." Calling it a 'must' read for the serious student and scholar of Deleuze, he says it rewards anyone with an interest in philosophy of time. According to Daniel W. Smith, Faulkner "tackles one of the most important but also most difficult aspects of Deleuze’s philosophy - the theory of temporality (repetition) - and his analyses of the 'three syntheses' are not only rigorous and penetrating, but also accessible."

== Bibliography ==
Books

- Deleuze and the Three Syntheses of Time (2006) London: Peter Lang. ISBN 978-0820481159
- The Force of Time: An Introduction to Deleuze Through Proust (2008) Maryland: University Press of America. ISBN 978-0761838784

Articles

- Faulkner, Keith W. (2002). "Deleuze in Utero: Deleuze-Sartre and the Essence of Woman." Angelaki 7(3):25-43.
