= Alice ter Meulen =

Dutch linguist

Prof Dr Alice ter Meulen
- Born: 4 March 1952 (age 74); Amsterdam, The Netherlands
- Education: University of Amsterdam
- Occupation: Linguist

Alice Geraldine Baltina ter Meulen (born 4 March 1952) is a Dutch linguist, logician, and philosopher of language whose research topics include genericity in linguistics, intensional logic, generalized quantifiers, discourse representation theory, and the linguistic representation of time. She is a professor emerita at the University of Geneva.

== Education and career ==
Ter Meulen was born in Amsterdam on 4 March 1952. She studied philosophy and linguistics at the University of Amsterdam, earning a bachelor's degree in philosophy in 1972 and master's degrees in philosophy and linguistics in 1976, all three degrees cum laude. She was granted a Ph.D. in philosophy of language at Stanford University in 1980; her dissertation, Substances, quantities and individuals: A study in the formal semantics of mass terms, was jointly supervised by mathematical logician Jon Barwise and philosopher Julius Moravcsik.

After postdoctoral research at the Max Planck Institute for Psycholinguistics and University of Groningen, she became an assistant professor of linguistics at the University of Washington in 1984, and was tenured in 1989. She moved to Indiana University Bloomington as an associate professor of Philosophy and Linguistics in 1989 and was promoted to full professor in 1996. She taught at the University of Amsterdam and the University of Utrecht, before moving to the University of Groningen in 1998, where she was appointed Professor of Modern English Linguistics, and given a personal chair in Semantic Theory and Cognitive Science in 2004. In 2009, she came to the University of Geneva as a research professor, from which she retired in 2016. She held visiting appointments at the University of Bucharest in Romania, and at the Beijing University of Languages and Linguistics. From 2003 to 2008 she was a member of the Dutch national science foundation NWO non-executive board, focusing on women scientist career prospects, ethnic minority recruitment for science, financial oversight and international relations. She served on numerous selection committees, international review boards for academic programs, and advisory boards in academia.

== Books ==
Ter Meulen is the author or coauthor of:

- Mathematical Methods in Linguistics (with Barbara Partee and Robert E. Wall, Kluwer, 1990).
- Representing Time in Natural Language: The Dynamic Interpretation of Tense and Aspect (MIT Press, 1995)

Her edited volumes include:

- Studies in Modeltheoretic Semantics (De Gruyter, 1983)
- Generalized Quantifiers in Natural Language (with Johan van Benthem, Foris, 1985)
- On Conditionals (with Elizabeth C. Traugott, Judy Snitzer Reilly, and Charles A. Ferguson, Cambridge University Press, 1986)
- The Representation of (in)definiteness (with Eric J. Reuland, MIT Press, 1987)
- Handbook of Logic and Language (with Johan van Benthem, MIT Press, 1997; 2nd ed., Elsevier, 2011)
- The Composition of Meaning: From lexeme to discourse (with Werner Abraham, John Benjamins Publishing, 2004)

== Recognition ==
Ter Meulen was elected to the Royal Netherlands Academy of Arts and Sciences in 2000, and to the Koninklijke Hollandsche Maatschappij der Wetenschappen in 2003. She was president of the European Society for Philosophy and Psychology for 2006–2008.

== See also ==
- Jack Hoeksema, linguist and professor in the Department of Dutch Language and Culture
