= Society for European Philosophy =

Organization

- Established: 1996
- Mission: The study of Continental philosophy
- Chair: Wahida Khandker, Ashley Woodward
- Website: societyforeuropeanphilosophy.com

The Society for European Philosophy (SEP) is a philosophical society founded in 1996. The organization sponsors an annual conference. It is the largest society for Continental philosophy in the UK.

== History ==
SEP was founded at Birkbeck College, University of London on the 28 June 1996. The original meeting sought to bring together scholars from across the UK "working in the various non/analytical traditions of European philosophy". The first full conference was held at Lancaster University in 1998, with SEP holding an annual conference each year since then. SEP aims to promote the understanding of the various traditions of European Philosophy within the Anglo-American philosophical world, within academia more broadly, and within the wider public sphere. The annual conference is the largest event aimed at researchers and others interested in Modern European Philosophy in Europe. The annual conference has been held across the United Kingdom, as well as in Ireland, the Netherlands, Italy and Hungary. From 2005 to 2019, the annual conference was held jointly with the Forum for European Philosophy. The 2023 conference took place from the 3rd to the 5th of July 2023 and was hosted by the Institute of Art Theory and Media Studies, Eötvös Loránd University (ELTE), in partnership with the Institute of Philosophy and the Faculty of Education and Psychology, ELTE Budapest, Hungary. The 2024 conference took place from the 2nd to the 4th of July 2024 and was hosted by Cardiff University.

== Executive Committee ==
There are currently 30 members of the SEP Committee from universities across the UK and Europe.

Current Executive Committee
Position	Name	Affiliation
Co-chair	Wahida Khandker	Manchester Metropolitan University
Co-chair	Ashley Woodward	University of Dundee
Treasurer	Jonathan Clark	Trinity Laban Conservatoire of Music and Dance
Secretary	Manhua Li	Royal Holloway, University of London
Communications Officer	Cillian Ó Fathaigh	Universidad Complutense de Madrid
Communications Officer	Eve Judah	University of Cambridge
Communications Officer	Hannah Wallenfels	Goethe-Universität Frankfurt am Main
Non-Conference Events Officer	Andrés Sáenz de Sicilia	Northeastern_University_–_London

Former chairpersons of SEP include Professor Beth Lord (2014 - 2018), Professor Stella Sandford (2018 - 2021) and Professor Clive Cazeaux (2021-2024).
