= Phillip M. Merikle =

Philip M. Merikle is a Distinguished Professor Emeritus in the Department of Psychology at the University of Waterloo, Canada. He is known for his published work on attentional processes, memory and anaesthesia see anaesthesia awareness, perception without awareness (see unconscious perception), and synaesthesia Merikle's early contributions rebutted against Daniel Holender's 1986 criticism of prior experiments which claimed to demonstrate unconscious priming following Anthony Marcel's work on unconscious processes. Merikle's work sought to shift the debate from indirect-without-direct effects determined by Holender to be the only way unconscious perception could be proved, to what he defined as objective (forced chance level) and subjective thresholds (a threshold of claimed awareness) as a means to distinguish stimuli presentation. He believed that the indirect-without-direct effect was too stringent of a requirement for proving unconscious perception and analyses. Merikle claimed that the subjective threshold is a better boundary between the conscious and unconscious rather than direct and indirect measures on the basis that to distinguish the two, all that is required is a qualitatively different effect between when information is consciously perceived than when it is unconsciously perceived.

== Notable Findings ==
In support of the use of subjective thresholds, Merikle's findings showed that primes affected decision times even below subjective thresholds, where participants claimed to be unable to decide whether or not stimuli had been presented or not. Contesting several of Holender's claims, such as the exclusiveness assumption and exhaustiveness assumption, Cheeseman and Merikle argued that subliminal perception can only be tested and proven when subjective criteria are used to distinguish the conscious from the unconscious. More recently, Merikle has published a number of studies which measure effects of stimuli and understanding below subjective threshold.

== Subjective Threshold ==
This is the point at which observers claim to be unable to determine whether or not they are detecting perceptual stimuli and information at a better than chance level. The stimuli presented between subjective and objective thresholds at which observers were able to show a grasp of the meaning of the word stimuli without showing awareness of having seen the word stimuli was considered semantic activation.

== Objective Threshold ==
The point at which observers are performing at chance level, and they are not responding differently to trials with and without stimuli. In terms of visual stimuli, the objective threshold was often below subjective threshold (i.e. if subjective threshold was stimuli shown at 300ms, then objective threshold could be 200ms).

== Relative Sensitivity Assumption ==
Merikle and Reingold proposed the relative sensitivity assumption in response to Holender's assumptions, which they claimed to be the only assumption required for studies on unconscious cognition. The relative sensitivity assumption assumes that the "sensitivity of a direct discrimination is greater than or equal to the sensitivity of a comparable indirect discrimination to conscious task relevant information." In other words, Reingold and Merikle argued that it is impossible for indirect measures to provide a more comprehensive understanding of relevant perceptual information than for direct measures such as indirect discriminations are always less than or equally sensitive to relevant perceptual information to direct discriminations.

== Meta-Analyses ==
Merikle has also coauthored two significant meta-analyses titled Consciousness and Cognition. as well as Working memory and language comprehension: A meta-analysis which supported the findings that predictive power of working memory measures such as reading span and listening span is greater than storage capacity measures such as word span and sentence span in showing comprehension.
