= Negative raising =

Linguistics phenomenon

In linguistics, negative raising is a phenomenon that concerns the raising of negation from the embedded or subordinate clause of certain predicates to the matrix or main clause. The higher copy of the negation, in the matrix clause, is pronounced; but the semantic meaning is interpreted as though it were present in the embedded clause.

== Background ==
The NEG-element was first introduced by Edward Klima, but the term neg raising has been accredited to the early transformational analysis as an instance of movement. Charles J. Fillmore was the first to propose a syntactic approach called neg transportation but is now known solely as negative raising. This syntactic approach was supported in the early beginnings by evidence provided by Robin Lakoff, who used, in part, strong/strict polarity items as proof. Laurence R. Horn and Robin Lakoff have written on the theory of negative raising, which is now considered to be the classical argumentation on this theory. Chris Collins and Paul Postal have also written in more recent times in defense of the classical argumentation to negative raising. These early accounts attributed negative raising to be derived syntactically, as they thought that the NEG element was c-commanding onto two verbs. Not all agreed with the syntactic view of negative raising. To counter the syntactically derived theory of neg raising, Renate Bartsch and a number of others argued that a syntactic analysis was insufficient to explain all the components of the neg raising (NR) theory. Instead they developed a presuppositional, otherwise known as a semantically based account. However, it is suggested by Chris Collins, Paul Postal, and Laurence R. Horn that the divide between these approaches is not necessary. An approach combining the two is argued for by Chris Collins and Paul Postal, who claim that using an exclusionist method is not viable.

== NEG-raising in English ==
In the syntactic view of classical Neg-raising, a NEG raises from its origin, the place in which it originates underlyingly, to the host, the place in which sits in the surface representation. In English, negative raising constructions utilize negation in the form of, "not," where it is then subject to clausal raising.

=== Examples of English NEG-raising ===
In the phenomenon of negative raising, this negation cannot be raised freely with any given predicate.

Consider the following example proposed by Paul Crowley, in which the verb "say" attempts to display negative raising:

1. Mary didn't say it would snow
2. Mary said it would not snow.

As seen in this example, "say" is not a predicate that can be used for Neg-raising, as the raising of the negation to the matrix clause creates the reading "Mary didn’t say it would snow," which holds a different meaning than "Mary said it would not snow," where the negation resides in the embedded clause.

To account for this fact, Laurence Horn has identified 5 distinct classes to account for the general predicates involved negative raising, as seen below in English:

Horn's classification of Neg-raising predicates
| Class of predicate | Examples |
|---|---|
| Opinion | think, believe, suppose, imagine, expect, reckon, feel, guess |
| Perception | seem, appear, look like, sound like, feel like |
| Probability | be probable, be likely, figure to |
| Volition | want, intend, choose, plan |
| Judgement | be supposed to, ought, should, be desirable, advise, suggest |

Chris Collins and Paul Postal refer to these predicates as classical negative raising predicates (CNRPs). Some CNRPs such as reckon and guess, exhibit more dialectal variation in their acceptability to speakers. They define what constitutes a CNRP as follows:

"If NEG raises from one clause B into the next clause above B, call it clause A, then the predicate of clause A is a CNRP."

Consider the Perception predicate, "look like," in which we can posit the following readings:

1. “It looks like [it will not rain today]”
2. “It does not look like [it will rain today]”

In this regard, “It does not look like [it will rain today]” is seen as a paraphrase of “It looks like [it will not rain today]." This is because even with the raising of the negation to the matrix clause, both sentences convey the same meaning, thus the matrix clause negation is to be interpreted as if it were within the embedded clause.

=== Analysis of English NEG-raising ===
In English, syntactically we can have negative phrase structures with the NEG in the matrix clause - the semantic interpretation of these phrases can be ambiguous;

- The negation could apply to the verb in the matrix clause
- The negation could apply to the verb in the embedded clause

==== Phrase structure with ambiguous and unambiguous NEG interpretation ====
| | Phrase structure with NEG in matrix clause |
|---|---|
| Phrase | [_{DP} I ] do not believe [_{TP} we are having a review session] |
| Interpretation 1 | I don't believe that there's going to be a review session |
| Interpretation 2 | I believe that there is not going to be a review session |

Syntax Tree 1

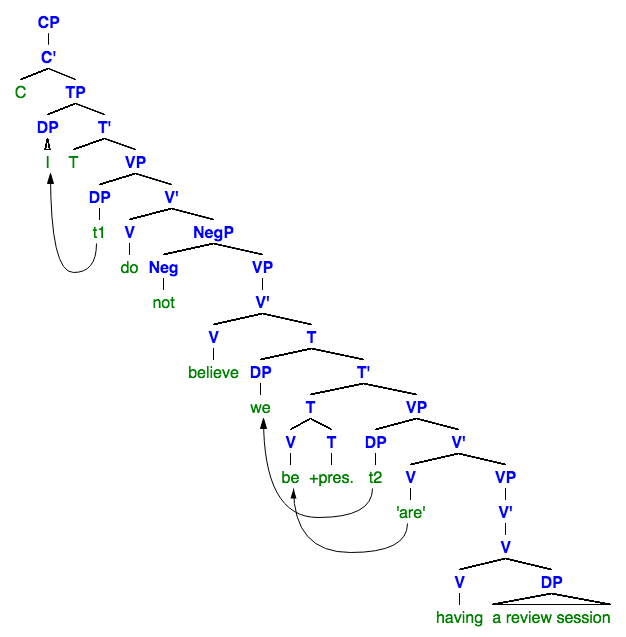

| | Phrase structure with NEG in embedded clause |
|---|---|
| Phrase | [_{DP} I ] believe [_{TP} we are not having a review session] |
| Interpretation | I believe that there is not going to be a review session |

Syntax Tree 2

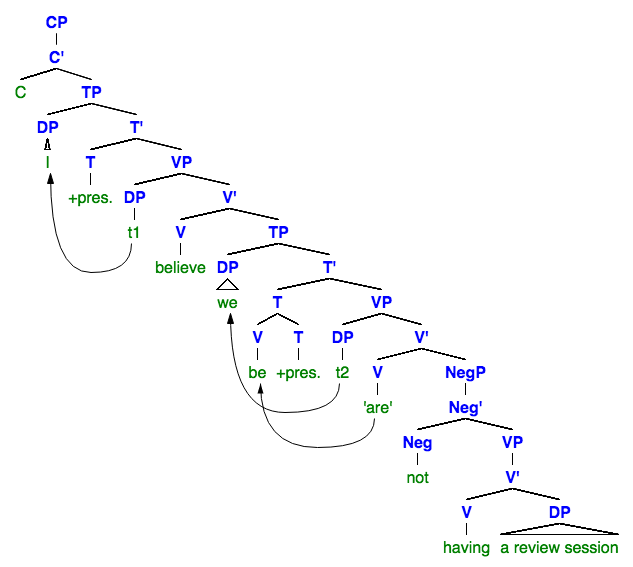

The English language has a rich inventory of operators; these operators (in this case NEG specifically), differ from each other in terms of their scope orders with respect to other operators (in this case Verb). When we look at negative raising - we are thus looking at the operator NEG, and its scope over the Verbs in a phrase. Sentence with negative raising are thus ambiguous in terms of NEG -

- In one reading NEG has scope over the matrix verb (Tree 1)
- in the other reading NEG has scope over the clausal verb (Tree 2)

==== Phrase structure showing NEG raising - from lower to upper position ====
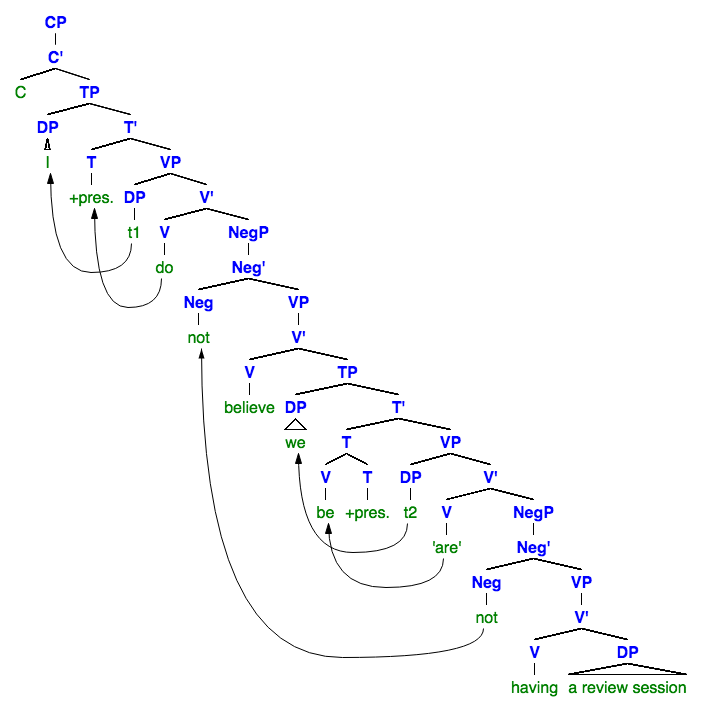

This tree illustrates how NEG can be raised from the embedded clause to the Matrix clause; thus it can be pronounced in the higher position while retaining its scope from the lower position.

==== Horn clauses ====
Horn clauses, named after the linguist Laurence R. Horn, who discovered the constructions, are clauses which feature a that clause complement containing an extracted NPI, triggering negative inversion, and further undergoing subject-auxiliary inversion. Take, for example, the following clause where the NPI is highlighted:

I don't think that ever before have the media played such a major role in a kidnapping.

Chris Collins and Paul Postal define rules that Horn clauses must abide by a few rules:

1. They must be complements.
2. They must be a complement of a CNRP as these manifest a strong reading for main clause negation

The following table shows examples of permitted Horn clauses:

Examples of Horn clauses
| Grammaticality | Sentence |
|---|---|
| Grammatical | I didn't expect that for any reason she would agree to that |
| Ungrammatical | *ever again would I agree to such a course of action |

The first sentence is grammatical as the Horn clause is a complement of a CNRP expect, and can therefore raise up to the main clause while still being interpretable in the embedded clause. The second sentence is viewed as impossible because the Horn clause is a main clause, and lacks an initial complementizer, such as that.

While the standard view of fronted NPIs is that they are indefinites or existentials, this raises an issue for the existence of Horn clauses, as negative Inversion is prevented. However, the nonstandard view of NPIs containing an instance of negation can explain how NEG is able to raise to the host. This is due to the conditions of the phrases that can be fronted in negative Inversion being met by the NEG as a part of the fronted NPI. Under the CNRP analysis of Horn clauses, the posited underlying structure does not yet have main clause negation or negative inversion.

The steps are detailed in the table below:

Steps of Neg-raising in Horn clauses
| Step | Sentence |
|---|---|
| Underlying representation | I do think that the media have [NEG_{1} ever before] played such a major role in a kidnapping. |
| Result of negative inversion | I do think that [NEG_{1} ever before] have the media <have> played such a major role in a kidnapping. |
| Result of NEG raising | I do [NEG_{1}] think that [<NEG_{1}> ever before] have the media <have> played such a major role in a kidnapping. |
| Resulting surface structure | I don't think that ever before have the media played such a major role in a kidnapping. |

==== Cloud of unknowing predicates ====
While Horn clauses are claimed to only be licensed by CNRPs, it is the case that other predicates which are non-CNRPs can also license them, such as know. Take, for example:

I don't know that ever before have the media played such a major role in a kidnapping.

This is analyzed as having both an overt NEG in the main clause, which unlike the CNRP analysis, does not raise up from the embedded clause, and a NEG in the embedded clause. The NEG in the main clause accounts for the semantic negation of the main clause. The NEG in the embedded clause ensures that negative inversion can still occur by satisfying its requirements. Because the resulting negatives would not give a meaning similar to that of the above sentence, an additional covert NEG is added to the complement clause. Both occurrences of NEG in the complement clause would then undergo deletion.

Steps of Neg-raising in cloud of unknowing predicates
| Step | Sentence |
|---|---|
| Underlying representation | I [NEG_{1} know] that the media have [[[<NEG_{2} SOME ever] before] played such a major role in a kidnapping]. |
| Result of negative inversion | I [NEG_{1} know] that [[[<NEG_{2}> SOME ever] before] have the media played such a major role in a kidnapping]. |
| Result of additional NEG | I [NEG_{1} know] that [<NEG_{3}>[[[<NEG_{2}> SOME ever] before] have the media played such a major role in a kidnapping]. |
| Resulting surface structure | I don't know that ever before have the media played such a major role in a kidnapping. |

==== Strict negative polarity items (NPIs) ====
Strict NPIs, like breathe a word, require a clause internal licenser as they are subject to syntactic locality constraints. However, negative raising is known to license strict NPIs, as seen in the following example, where the negation is in the main clause rather than the embedded clause:

Stanley doesn't believe that Carolyn will breathe a word about it

Phrase structure showing NEG- raising licensing a strict NPI

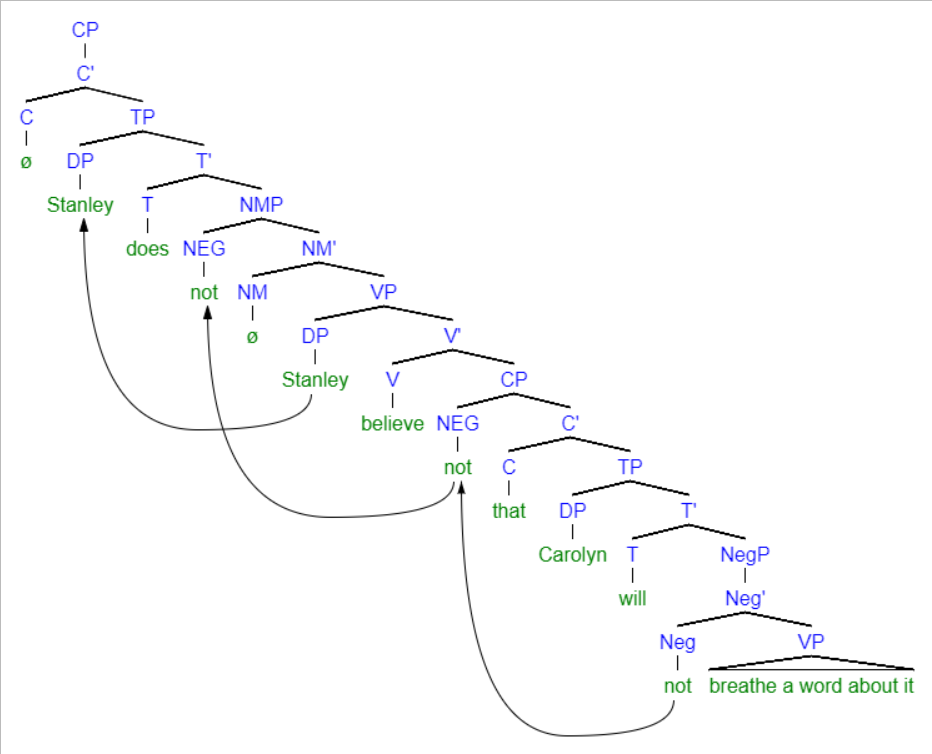

This suggests that the negation originates in the embedded clause, as sister to the VP breathe a word, thus satisfying the locality of selection, being in the embedded clause before participating in raising, moving first to spec CP, and then to its host in the main clause. The analysis proposed by Chris Collins and Paul Postal draws on minimalist syntax, where the negation moves up to the specifier position of the functional projection, Negative Merge Phrase (NMP). Though the phrase is covert, the spec NM position acts as the host to the raised negation.

==== Island constraints ====
Movement of negation from the embedded clause to the main clause is blocked in a variety of cases where a syntactic island is formed, as exemplified by The Island Sensitivity of NEG Raising Condition:

"If K is a clause and an island, then NEG cannot extract from K."

===== Wh- islands =====
Neg-raising is not permitted in wh- islands. Consider the following examples, where negation is only permitted in the embedded clause and not the main clause, despite the ability of negation in the main clause to license strict NPIs:

Wh- islands
| Grammaticality | Sentence |
|---|---|
| Grammatical | I planned how not to tell a living soul about the money. |
| Ungrammatical | I did not plan how to tell a living soul about the money. |

This can be explained by the wh- word how undergoing movement first, filling the space in spec CP. Once this happens, negation can no longer participate in cyclic movement by stopping in spec CP before moving to the host NM in the main clause. The resulting violation of cyclic movement gives us the ungrammatical sentence.

== Negative raising in other languages ==
Aside from English, negative raising has been an apparent phenomenon in a variety of languages:

=== Modern Greek ===
Negative raising works similar to English in Modern Greek but there appears to be clearer evidence of its existence in the language.

This is evidenced in the usage of negative polarity items and the usage of ακόμα (akóma) (the time adverb) in this language.

==== akόma (the time adverb) ====
When the adverb akόma (translated as "yet" or "still" in English) is paired with a verb in the aorist, the negation δεν (den) makes the clause grammatical (e.g. δεν _{aorist} αkόmα) as it imperfectivises it. This clause cannot stand as an independent clause if the negation is not present, showing that the pair appear together in the same context (for it to be grammatical, another verb form would have to be used). However, when the ungrammatical clause (e.g. * _{aorist} αkόmα) is embedded in a matrix clause, a negation appears before a "Neg-raiser" verb that is located in the higher clause - suggesting that the negation was moved from the embedded clause into the matrix clause.

==== Negative polarity items (NPI) ====
When an embedded clause (consisting of an NPI) is embedded in a matrix clause (consisting a "Neg-raiser" verb), the negation could appear before or after the "Neg-raiser" verb. In both cases, the sentence would remain grammatical. However, when a non "Neg-raiser" verb is used in the matrix clause, the negation is only allowed after the verb, before the embedded clause.

=== French ===
In French, evidence of negative raising can be demonstrated through the use of tag questions and corrective responses, where negation is primarily depicted by the negative construction, "ne...pas."

==== Tag questions ====
When analyzing French tag questions, the tags 'oui' or 'non' are both seen with affirmative statements, while the tag 'non' is only selected by negative statements.

negative raising can be demonstrated through the observation that when the negation is in the embedded clause, it is able to take a tag. This can be seen through the use of the verb 'supposer,' to suppose, which coincides with Horn's proposed classes of negative-raising predicates:

Tag Questions in French with the verb 'Supposer'
| French + tag | English translation |
|---|---|
| i) Je suppose que Max est parti, oui / non? | I suppose Max has left, yes / no? |
| ii) Je ne suppose pas que Max soit parti, non? | I don't suppose Max has left, no? |
| iii) Je suppose que Max n'est pas parti, non? | I suppose Max hasn't left, no? |

Through this depiction, with both the matrix clause negation in ii) and embedded clause negation in iii) possessing the ability to take a tag, evidence is given that ii) surfaces via negative raising from the structures like iii). Thus, despite the movement of the negative "ne...pas" to the matrix clause, the meaning of ii) is seen as a paraphrase of iii).

==== Corrective responses ====
The use of corrective responses in French is similar to that of tag questions, with the exception that there are three attested answers to corrective responses: 'oui', 'si,' and 'non.' 'Oui' or 'non' are used to express affirmation, while negative questions are expressed by 'si' or 'non.'

As seen through the continued use of the verb 'supposer,' to suppose, negative raising can be demonstrated in the following examples:

Corrective responses in French with the verb 'supposer'
| French | English translation | Possible responses in French |
|---|---|---|
| i) Je suppose que Jean vient de Djibouti | I suppose that Jean comes from Djibouti | Mais oui! / Mais non! |
| ii) Je suppose que Jean ne vient pas de Djibouti | I suppose that Jean does not come from Djibouti | Mais si! / Mais non! |
| iii) Je ne suppose pas que Jean vienne de Djibouti | I do not suppose that Jean comes from Djibouti | Mais si! / Mais non! |

In this data, it appears that the way in which the possible responses 'si'/'oui' are distributed relies upon the polarity of that to which it is a response. This statement further infers that negative raising is a process involved, given that ii) and iii) both permit the answer “Mais si!” or “Mais non!” despite the negation surfacing in separate clauses. This prompts evidence that they depict the same meaning despite the movement of the negation in the phrase, and thus, both structures originating their negation in the embedded clause.

=== Japanese ===
In Japanese, there are instances of neg-head raising. This is evidenced, in part, through negative polarity items and the negative nai 'not'. It is suggested that one of the main differences between Japanese and English is that the extent of negative scope is based on whether there is or is not any neg-head raising to a higher position. In addition, neg-head raising has been to attributed to being responsible for clause-wide negative scope in Japanese. This is different from English in that the negative scope in Japanese extends over the tense phrase (TP) because of neg-head raising.

==== Negative polarity item (NPIs) ====
In Japanese there are two types of NPIs: an argument modifier type and a floating modifier type. In Japanese, NPIs need to occur within the scope domain of the negator. What this means is that if the NPI were to occur in the matrix clause and the negator in the embedded clause, it would be considered to be ungrammatical, as it would not be within the scope domain of the negator. Another aspect which differentiates Japanese from English, in reference to Japanese NPIs, is that NPIs are considered to be legitimate regardless of whether they appear in the subject or the object position in simple verbal clauses.

Listed below are some example of Japanese NPIs.

Japanese negative polarity items
| Japanese | English translation |
|---|---|
| dare-mo | anyone |
| amari | very |
| ken-sika | 'ken'-only |

==== Negative nai 'not' ====
Neg-head raising is also evidenced from the negative nai 'not'. The negative nai 'not' is neg-head raised, but it seems presently to only be raised when with a predicate with some verbal properties, as is shown by the NPI data. The evidence provided from the negative nai 'not' shows that the scope of nai moves from only being in the negative phrase (NegP) to extending over the tense phrase (TP). Additionally, when nai doesn't undergo neg-head raising, it results in subject-object/complement asymmetry.

=== Serbo-Croatian ===
In Serbo-Croatian there is obligatory NEG raising in sentences which contain the ni-NPI accompanied by the NEG ne. This happens, as unlike English, SC does not have no-forms i.e. Unary NEG structures, without a DP external NEG. Thus sentences in Serbo-Croatian, lacking a clausally located NEG are ungrammatical.

==== Examples of NEG raising ====
Ungrammatical sentence lacking clausal NEG
| Serbo-Croatian | *Marija ce videti niko-ga |
| Gloss | Mary will see no-one-ACC |

Instead the raising process is employed; the underlying NEG ne originates in the lower embedded DP, and raises to the matrix, leaving behind a copy. Only the upper copy of the word is pronounced, so there is no possibility of an incorrect double negation analysis of the meaning. This can be seen as analogous to English sentences that contain a NEG internal to the DP combined with an NPI.

The structure of the sentence in these cases is as follows:

Grammatical sentence structure with NEG raising
| Serbo-Croatian | Mian NEG_{1}, vidi [_{DP}[_{D} cNEG_{1} i] [[_{NP} šta]] |
| Gloss | Milan not see something |

== See also ==
- Verb phrase ellipsis
- Minimalist program
