= Miguel de Beistegui =

French philosophy professor

- Born: 3 April 1966 (age 60)

Education
- Education: Loyola University of Chicago (PhD); Université de Paris I-Sorbonne (MA); Université de Paris IV-Sorbonne (BA)
- Thesis: Heidegger and the Question of the Political (1990)
- Doctoral advisor: John Sallis
- Other advisors: David Bruce Ingram, Paul Davies

Philosophical work
- Era: 21st-century philosophy
- Region: Western philosophy
- School: Continental
- Institutions: University of Warwick
- Doctoral students: Michael Lewis
- Main interests: post-Kantian philosophy

Miguel de Beistegui (born 3 April 1966) is a continental philosopher and Professor of Philosophy at the University of Warwick. He is known for his expertise on Heidegger's thought.

== Books ==
- Heidegger and the Political, Routledge, 1998
- Philosophy and Tragedy (ed. with Simon Sparks), Routledge, 2000
- Thinking with Heidegger: Displacements, Indiana University Press, 2003
- Truth and Genesis: Philosophy as Differential Ontology, Indiana University Press, 2004
- The New Heidegger, Continuum, 2005
- Proust as Philosopher: The Art of Metaphor, Routledge, 2012
- Immanence and Philosophy: Deleuze, Edinburgh University Press, 2010
- Éloge de Chillida/In Praise of Chillida, Gourcuff/Gradenigo, 2011
- Aesthetics After Metaphysics: From Mimesis to Metaphor, Routledge, 2012
- The Care of Life: Transdisciplinary Perspectives in Bioethics and Biopolitics (ed. with G. Bianco and M. Gracieuse), Rowman and Littlefield, 2014
- The Government of Desire: A Genealogy of the Liberal Subject, Chicago University Press, 2018
- Lacan: A Genealogy, Bloomsbury, 2021
- L'élan du désir : Pour une éthique de la volupté, Seuil, 2021
- Thought Under Threat: On Superstition, Spite, and Stupidity, Chicago University Press, 2022
