= Andrew Benjamin =

Australian philosopher

Andrew Benjamin (born 1952, Australia) is an Australian philosopher. He holds a post as distinguished professor at the University of Technology, Sydney. Benjamin first came to critical attention with his writings in continental philosophy, writing articles and editing books on the thinking of Martin Heidegger, Theodor Adorno, Walter Benjamin, Julia Kristeva and Jean-François Lyotard. Benjamin has become involved in the field of architecture, to the extent that he has also taught in various schools of architecture in UK, US and Australia.

== Education ==
MA, BA (The Australian National University) Diplome d'Etude Avancee (University of Paris 7, France) PhD (University of Warwick, UK)

== Career ==
Benjamin's career began as a lecturer in philosophy at the University of Warwick, UK, where he was later professor of philosophy and director of the Centre for Research in Philosophy and Literature at the same university. He has also been visiting professor of architectural theory at Columbia University, New York, US, visiting critic at the Architectural Association in London, UK, and professor of critical theory in the Centre for Comparative Literature and Cultural Studies at Monash University and at the University of Technology, Sydney, Australia. He is recurrent visiting professor at the Centre for Cultural Studies, Goldsmiths, University of London. Benjamin is a fellow of the Australian Academy of the Humanities.

== On architecture ==
Benjamin's writings on architecture – for instance the early essay "Eisenman and the Housing of Tradition" (Art, Mimesis and the Avant-Garde, 1991) – have started from the premise that architecture is a critical activity not a synonym for building, or as he argued in his book Architectural Philosophy (2000) a virtuality not merely an actuality. The theoretical basis for such a position is the so-called linguistic turn in philosophy, seeing language as constructing reality. "Philosophy can never be free of architecture", so he argues, finding architectural metaphors pervading philosophy in terms of foundations and edifices. And just as Descartes, the father of modern philosophy, attempted to think of philosophy from first principles – from the cogito (the thinking subject) – so a critical architecture is seen to contest its tradition, if not fully succeeding in getting beyond notions such as shelter and dwelling. On the other hand, as a critical practice, architecture – in a similar way as the relationship between literary criticism and literature – is allowed to pursue its own hermetic, critical inquiry. In terms of architectural production, this sees the development of unbuilt (and even perhaps presently unbuildable) "architectural" models within cyberspace as having equal validity as implemented works, if not even more validity if one defines architecture as a critical activity. Such a position also, by definition, supports an avant-gardist approach to the architectural production.

== A selection of writings by Andrew Benjamin ==
- Style and Time: Essays on the Politics of Appearance, Northwestern University Press, Evanston, 2006.
- Disclosing Spaces: On Painting, Clinamen Press, 2004.
- Philosophy's Literature, Clinamen Press, Manchester, 2001.
- Architectural Philosophy, Athlone Press, London, 2000.
- Present Hope: Philosophy, Architecture, Judaism, Routledge, London, 1997.
- What is Abstraction?, Academy Editions, London, 1996.
- Object Painting, Academy Editions, London, 1994.
- The Plural Event: Descartes, Hegel, Heidegger, Routledge, London, 1993.
- Art, Mimesis and the Avant-Garde, Routledge, London, 1991.
- Translation and the Nature of Philosophy: A new theory of words, Routledge, London, 1989.
- (with Christopher Norris), What is Deconstruction?, St. Martins Press, New York, 1988. (German edition: Was ist Dekonstruktion? Verlag fur Architektur, Artemis, Munich, 1990).

Andrew Benjamin also edited The Lyotard Reader (1989), Abjection, Melancholia and Love: The Work of Julia Kristeva (1990), Walter Benjamin's Philosophy: Destruction and Experience (1993) and Walter Benjamin and Romanticism (2002). He is also joint editor of the series Walter Benjamin Studies published by Continuum Press.
