= Downward entailing =

In linguistic semantics, a downward entailing (DE) propositional operator is one that constrains the meaning of an expression to a lower number or degree than would be possible without the expression. For example, "not," "nobody," "few people," "at most two boys." Conversely, an upward-entailing operator constrains the meaning of an expression to a higher number or degree, for example "more than one." A context that is neither downward nor upward entailing is non-monotone, such as "exactly five."

A downward-entailing operator reverses the relation of semantic strength among expressions. An expression like "run fast" is semantically stronger than the expression "run" since "John ran fast" entails "John ran," but not conversely. But a downward-entailing context reverses this strength; for example, the proposition "At most two boys ran" entails that "At most two boys ran fast" but not the other way around.

An upward-entailing operator preserves the relation of semantic strength among a set of expressions; for example "more than three ran fast" entails "more than three ran" but not the other way around.

Ladusaw (1980) proposed that downward entailment is the property that licenses polarity items. Indeed, "Nobody saw anything" is downward entailing and admits the negative polarity item anything, while *"I saw anything" is unacceptable (the upward-entailing context does not license such a polarity item). This approach explains many but not all typical cases of polarity item sensitivity. Subsequent attempts to describe the behavior of polarity items rely on a broader notion of nonveridicality.

== Strawson-DE ==
Downward entailment does not explain the licensing of any in certain contexts such as with only:

Only John ate any vegetables for breakfast.

This is not a downward-entailing context because the above proposition does not entail “Only John ate kale for breakfast” (John may have eaten spinach, for example).

Kai von Fintel (1999) observed that although only does not exhibit the classical DE pattern, it is still DE in a special way. He defines a notion of Strawson downward entailingness based on the concept of Strawson entailment, where entailments can be checked while ignoring presupposition failures. The reasoning scheme is as follows:

1. P → Q
2. [[ only John ]] (P) is defined.
3. [[ only John ]] (Q) is true.
4. Therefore, [[ only John ]] (P) is true.

Here, (2) is the intended presupposition. For example:

1. Kale is a vegetable.
2. Somebody ate kale for breakfast.
3. Only John ate any vegetables for breakfast.
4. Therefore, only John ate kale for breakfast.

Hence only is a Strawson-DE and therefore licenses any.

Giannakidou (2002) argues that Strawson-DE allows not just the presupposition of the evaluated sentence but just any arbitrary proposition to count as relevant. This results in over-generalization that validates the use if any in contexts where it is, in fact, ungrammatical, such as clefts, preposed exhaustive focus, and each/both:

* It was John who talked to anybody.
* John talked to anybody.
* Each student who saw anything reported to the Dean.
* Both students who saw anything reported to the Dean.

== See also ==
- Entailment (pragmatics)
- Monotonicity of entailment
- Polarity item
- Veridicality
