= Anthony Marcel =

British psychologist

Anthony Marcel is a British psychologist who contributed to the early debate on the nature of unconscious perceptual processes in the 1970s and 1980s. Marcel argued in favour of an unconscious mind that "…automatically re-describe(s) sensory data into every representational form and to the highest levels of description available to the organism.” Marcel sparked controversy with his claim to have demonstrated unconscious priming. As of 2013 Marcel was working at the University of Hertfordshire and Cambridge University where his research focused on consciousness and phenomenological experience.

== Academic career ==
Marcel undertook his PhD at the University of Reading. From 1980 until 2005 Marcel worked at the Medical Research Council Applied Psychology Unit (later the MRC Cognition and Brain Sciences Unit) in Cambridge. In 2005 he became a Professor of Psychology at the University of Hertfordshire where he was eventually made professor emeritus. He has held a senior professorial research position in the Department of Experimental Psychology of Cambridge University and is also a Senior Research Associate at the Institute of Philosophy at London University.

=== Unconscious perception ===
Marcel is known within the study of unconscious phenomenon for two publications in a 1983 issue of Cognitive Psychology demonstrating unconscious perception and investigating the effects of masking; a process designed to interrupt, prevent or stop perceptual processing. The first used five experiments with dichoptic masking, energy masking, the lexical decision task, and the Stroop effect to investigate perception without awareness. Marcel notably used dichoptic stimulus-onset asynchrony pattern masking to show that as the interval between presentations of a target stimulus and following mask is reduced, subjects progressively lost information regarding the target stimulus. In his second 1983 publication, Marcel differentiates between perceptual processing and awareness, distinguishing between the effects of energy masking and backward pattern masking.

Marcel’s research on unconscious perception occurred during a time when the concept of unconscious cognition was not widely accepted within mainstream academic psychology. Although the cognitive revolution had made cognitive psychology a respectable field of study, the schism between academic psychology and psychoanalysis ensured that terms associated with psychoanalysis, such as "subliminal" and "unconscious," remained highly stigmatised. Marcel was able to overcome this stigma by framing his findings in the context of existing and accepted cognitive work.

Marcel began the research that would eventually lead him to unconscious perception in the early 1970s, with his work initially rooted in reading. The experiments detailed in Marcel’s 1983 publications were prompted by unexpected findings in masked reading tasks with school children. At that time, Marcel was working with neurological patients who showed deep dyslexia, and was interested in their errors involving associatively or semantically related words (e.g. sleep and dream). Marcel was manipulating interstimulus intervals in the lexical decision task, wherein words are shown as priming stimuli to facilitate judgment of whether the target stimulus is a word (e.g. the target word "butter" primes for "bread" but not "nurse") to test what impact this might have on the facilitation effect. He noticed the children making errors that indicated the masked words were acting as priming stimuli. This was suggestive of unconscious perception and therefore contrary to the theories and masking literature of the time. Marcel also researched the processing of polysemous words (e.g. difference in process of "palm" when preceded by masked word "wrist" vs. "tree"). This research showed qualitative differences between conscious and unconscious perception of words with multiple meanings, namely that both meanings seemed to be simultaneously activated when presented unconsciously, but only one meaning was activated at a time when presented consciously.

=== Debate ===
Marcel's 1983 publications were met with enthusiasm as well as criticism. Most notably, Daniel Holender’s 1986 publication criticised all prior unconscious priming experiment, particularly Marcel’s. Holender took issue with the direct measures used in experiments purporting to demonstrate unconscious perception and claimed that establishing indirect effects in the absolute absence of direct effects was required to demonstrate SSA (subliminal semantic activation). This requirement is generally accepted as being too stringent, with the distinction between objective and subjective thresholds proposed by Jim Cheesman and Phillip M. Merikle being more accepted and offering a more achievable demonstration of SSA.

=== Later research ===
Marcel's later research focuses on consciousness and phenomenal experience. His research on neglect and anosognosia for hemiplegia has continued his work on lack of conscious awareness in neurological patients, investigating similarities between a subgroup of delusional anosognosic patients and psychotic delusional patients.

== Publications and awards ==
Bermudez, J., Marcel, A. and Eilan, N. (Eds) (1995). The Body and the Self. Cambridge, Mass: MIT Press.

Gallagher, S. and Marcel, A.J. (1999). The Self in Contextualized Action. Journal of Consciousness Studies, 6 (4), 4–30. (Reprinted in Models of the Self, Eds. Shaun Gallagher and Jonathan Shear, Thorverton, UK: Imprint Academic, 1999, 273–299.)

Lambie, J.A. & Marcel, A.J. (2002). Consciousness and Emotion Experience: A Theoretical Framework. Psychological Review, 109, 219–259.

Marcel, A.J. (1998). Blindsight and shape perception: deficit of visual consciousness or of visual function? Brain, 121 (8), 1565–1588.

Marcel, A.J. (2003). Introspective Report: Trust, Self Knowledge and Science. Journal of Consciousness Studies, 10 (9), 167–186.

Marcel, A.J. Phenomenal experience and functionalism. In Consciousness in Contemporary Science. A.J. Marcel and E. Bisiach (Eds), Oxford University Press, pp. 121–158, 1988.

Marcel, A.J. (1993). Slippage in the unity of consciousness. In Ciba Foundation Symposium No 174 – Experimental and Theoretical Studies of Consciousness. Chichester: John Wiley, pp. 168–186, 1993.

Marcel, A.J. The personal level in cognitive rehabilitation. In Neuropsychological Rehabilitation, N. von Steinbüchel, D.Y. von Cramon, E. Pöppel (Eds), Heidelberg: Springer-Verlag, pp. 155–168, 1992.

Marcel, A.J. The Sense of Agency: Awareness and Ownership of Actions and Intentions. In Roessler J. and Eilan N. (Eds) Agency and Self Awareness, Oxford University Press. 2003.

Marcel, A.J. & Lambie J.A. (2004). How many selves in emotion experience? Psychological Review, 111, 820–826.

Marcel, A.J., Tegnr, R & Nimmo-Smith, I., (2004). Anosognosia for plegia: specificity, extension, partiality, and disunity of bodily unawareness. Cortex, 40, 19–40.

Marcel, A., Postma, P., Gillmeister, H., Cox, S., Rorden, C., Nimmo-Smith, I., Mackintosh, B. (2004). Tactile Migration and Fusion in Healthy People: Premorbid Susceptibility to Allochiria, Neglect and Extinction? Neuropsychologia, 42, 1749–1767

Marcel, A.J., Mackintosh, B., Postma, P., Cusack, R., Vuckovich, J., Nimmo-Smith, I., and Cox, S.M.L. (2006). Is Susceptibility to Perceptual Migration and Fusion Modality-Specific or Multimodal? Neuropsychologia, 44, 693–710.

Marcel, A.J. & Dobel, C. (2005). Structured Perceptual Input Imposes an Egocentric Frame of Reference: Pointing, Imagery and Spatial Self-Consciousness. Perception, 34, 429–451.

Muggleton, N., Postma, P., Nimmo-Smith, I., Moutsopoulou, K., Marcel, A.J. and Walsh, V. (2006). TMS over right posterior parietal cortex induces neglect in a scene-based frame of reference. Neuropsychologia, 44,1222–1229.

Nimmo-Smith, I, Marcel, A.J., & Tegnr, R. (2005). A diagnostic test of unawareness of bilateral motor abilities in anosognosia for hemiplegia. Journal of Neurology, Neurosurgery, and Psychiatry, 76, 1167–1169.

Awards: Anthony Marcel has been awarded a Fellowship of the Association for Psychological Science in recognition of his sustained outstanding contributions to the science of psychology.
