= Veridicality =

Semantic or grammatical assertion of the truth

In linguistics, veridicality (from Latin "truthfully said") is a semantic or grammatical assertion of the truth of an utterance.

== Definition ==
Merriam-Webster defines "veridical" as truthful, veracious and non illusory. It stems from the Latin "veridicus", composed of Latin verus, meaning "true", and dicere, which means "to say". For example, the statement "Paul saw a snake" asserts belief in the claim, while "Paul did see a snake" is an even stronger assertion of a correct basis for that belief (he perceived an object, believed it to be a snake, and it was in fact a snake).

The formal definition of veridicality views the context as a propositional operator (Giannakidou 1998).

1. A propositional operator F is veridical iff Fp entails p, that is, Fp → p; otherwise F is nonveridical.
2. Additionally, a nonveridical operator F is antiveridical iff Fp entails not p, that is, Fp → ¬p.

For temporal and aspectual operators, the definition of veridicality is somewhat more complex:

- For operators relative to instants of time: Let F be a temporal or aspectual operator, and t an instant of time.
  1. F is veridical iff for Fp to be true at time t, p must be true at a (contextually relevant) time t′ ≤ t; otherwise F is nonveridical.
  2. A nonveridical operator F is antiveridical iff for Fp to be true at time t, ¬p must be true at a (contextually relevant) time t′ ≤ t.
- For operators relative to intervals of time: Let F be a temporal or aspectual operator, and t an interval of time.
  1. F is veridical iff for Fp to be true of t, p must be true of all (contextually relevant) t′ ⊆ t; otherwise F is nonveridical.
  2. A nonveridical operator F is antiveridical iff for Fp to be true of t, ¬p must be true of all (contextually relevant) t′ ⊆ t.

== Nonveridical operators ==
Negation is veridical, though of opposite polarity, sometimes called antiveridical: "Paul didn't see a snake" asserts that the statement "Paul saw a snake" is false. In English, non-indicative moods or irrealis moods are frequently used in a nonveridical sense: "Paul may have seen a snake" and "Paul would have seen a snake" do not assert that Paul actually saw a snake and the second implies that he did not. "Paul would indeed have seen a snake" is veridical, and some languages have separate veridical conditional moods for such cases.

Nonveridicality has been proposed to be behind the licensing of polarity items such as the English words any and ever, as an alternative to the influential downward entailment theory (see below) proposed by Ladusaw (1980). Anastasia Giannakidou (1998) argued that various polarity phenomena observed in language are manifestations of the dependency of polarity items to the (non)veridicality of the context of appearance. The (non)veridical dependency may be positive (licensing), or negative (anti-licensing), and arises from the sensitivity semantics of polarity items. Across languages, different polarity items may show sensitivity to veridicality, anti-veridicality, or non-veridicality.

Nonveridical operators typically license the use of polarity items, which in veridical contexts normally is ungrammatical:

* Mary saw any students. (The context is veridical.)
Mary didn't see any students. (The context is nonveridical.)

=== Downward entailment ===
All downward entailing contexts are nonveridical. Because of this, theories based on nonveridicality can be seen as extending those based on downward entailment, allowing more cases of polarity item licensing to be explained.

Downward entailment predicts that polarity items will be licensed in the scope of negation, downward entailing quantifiers like few N, at most n N, no N, and the restriction of every:

No students saw anything.
Mary didn't see anything.
Few children saw anything.
Every student who saw anything should report to the police.

=== Non-monotone quantifiers ===
Quantifiers like exactly three students, nobody but John, and almost nobody are non-monotone (and thus not downward entailing) but nevertheless admit any:

% Exactly three students saw anything.
Nobody but Mary saw anything.
Almost nobody saw anything.

=== Hardly and barely ===
Hardly and barely allow for any despite not being downward entailing.

Mary hardly talked to anybody. (Does not entail "Mary hardly talked to her mother".)
Mary barely studied anything. (Does not entail "Mary barely studied linguistics".)

=== Questions ===
Polarity items are quite frequent in questions, although questions are not monotonic.

Did you see anything?

Although questions biased towards the negative answer, such as "Do you [even] give a damn about any books?" (tag questions based on negative sentences exhibit even more such bias), can sometimes be seen as downward entailing, this approach cannot account for the general case, such as the above example where the context is perfectly neutral. Neither can it explain why negative questions, which naturally tend to be biased, don't license negative polarity items.

In semantics which treats a question as the set of its true answers, the denotation of a polar question contains two possible answers:

[[Did you see Mary?]] = { you saw Mary ∨ you didn't see Mary }

Because disjunction p ∨ q entails neither p nor q, the context is nonveridical, which explains the admittance of any.

=== Future ===
Polarity items appear in future sentences.

Mary will buy any bottle of wine.
The children will leave as soon as they discover anything.

According to the formal definition of veridicality for temporal operators, future is nonveridical: that "John will buy a bottle of Merlot" is true now does not entail that "John buys a bottle of Merlot" is true at any instant up to and including now. On the other hand, past is veridical: that "John bought a bottle of Merlot" is true now entails that there is an instant preceding now at which "John buys a bottle of Merlot" is true.

=== Habitual aspect ===
Likewise, nonveridicality of the habitual aspect licenses polarity items.

He usually reads any book very carefully.

The habitual aspect is nonveridical because e.g., that "He is usually cheerful" is true over some interval of time does not entail that "He is cheerful" is true over every subinterval of that. This is in contrast to e.g., the progressive aspect, which is veridical and prohibits negative polarity items.

=== Generic sentences ===
Non-monotone generic sentences accept polarity items.

Any cat hunts mice.

=== Modal verbs ===
Modal verbs create generally good environments for polarity items:

Mary may talk to anybody.
Any minors must be accompanied by their parents.
The committee can give the job to any candidate.

Such contexts are nonveridical despite being non-monotone and sometimes even upward entailing ("Mary must tango" entails "Mary must dance").

=== Imperatives ===
Imperatives are roughly parallel to modal verbs and intensional contexts in general.

Take any apple. (cf. "You may/must take any apple", "I want you to take any apple".)

=== Protasis of conditionals ===
Protasis of conditionals is one of the most common environments for polarity items.

If you sleep with anybody, I'll kill you.

=== Directive intensional verbs ===
Polarity items are licensed with directive propositional attitudes but not with epistemic ones.

Mary would like to invite any student.
Mary asked us to invite any student.
* Mary believes that we invited any student.
* Mary dreamt that we invited any student.
