= Matthew Nudds =

British philosopher

Education
- Education: University College London (PhD)
- Thesis: The nature of the senses (2000)
- Doctoral advisor: Michael G. F. Martin

Philosophical work
- Era: 21st-century philosophy
- Region: Western philosophy
- School: Analytic
- Institutions: University of Warwick
- Main interests: philosophy of mind and philosophy of perception

Matthew Nudds is a British philosopher and Professor of Philosophy at the University of Warwick where he is also Chair of the Faculty of Social Sciences. He is known for his works on philosophy of mind and philosophy of perception.

== Books ==
- Rational Animals, edited with S. Hurley, Oxford University Press, 2009
- Sounds and perception: new philosophical essays, edited with C. O’Callaghan. Oxford University Press, 2009
