= Diarmuid Costello =

British philosopher

Education
- Education: University of Essex (PhD)
- Thesis: Aesthetics after modernism (2002)

Philosophical work
- Era: 21st-century philosophy
- Region: Western philosophy
- School: Continental
- Institutions: University of Warwick
- Main interests: philosophy of art

Diarmuid Costello is a British philosopher and Professor of Philosophy at the University of Warwick. He is known for his works on aesthetics and the philosophy of art. Costello chaired the British Society of Aesthetics executive committee and was a Leverhulme Senior Research Fellow.

== Books ==
- On Photography: A Philosophical Inquiry, Routledge, 2017
- The Life and Death of Images: Ethics and Aesthetics, Co-edited with Dominic Willsdon, Tate Publishing and Cornell UP, 2008
