= European Society for Philosophy and Psychology =

- Logo of the ESPP
- Formation: 1992
- President: Robyn Carston
- Website: http://www.eurospp.org/

The European Society for Philosophy and Psychology (ESPP) is a professional organization in Europe that promotes discussion and research at the intersection of philosophy, psychology and cognitive science. It is the European counterpart of the American Society for Philosophy and Psychology. The first joint conference of the two societies was held in Barcelona in 2004.

== List of presidents ==
- 1999–2001: Josef Perner
- 2001–2003: Pierre Jacob
- 2006–2008: Alice ter Meulen
- 2009–2011: Marc Jeannerod
- 2009–2014: Naomi Eilan
- 2017–present: Robyn Carston
