= Jack Hoeksema =

Dutch linguist

Jacob "Jack" Hoeksema (born 30 October 1956 in Groningen) is a linguist and professor in the Department of Dutch Language and Culture with a specialities in semantics, morphology, and historical linguistics. His first degree was in Dutch literature and linguistics at the University of Groningen in 1981, and his PhD was completed at the same university in 1984 (with the dissertation Categorial Morphology).

Hoeksema has been instrumental in the study of negative polarity, and his work is part of the Dutch school of generalized quantifier theory. He is especially known for applying results from the study of monotonicity to polarity phenomena, and in criticizing too narrow construals of what counts as a polarity licensor. He has also worked extensively on the historical development of various aspects of grammar, mostly from corpora of Dutch and English, including documenting the changes in polarity items and in quantifiers.

== See also ==
- Alice ter Meulen, Dutch linguist, logician, and philosopher of language
- negative polarity
