= Frans Zwarts =

Frans Zwarts (born 26 March 1949 in The Hague) was the rector magnificus (academic president) of the University of Groningen (2002–2011) and a linguist and professor in the Department of Dutch Language and Culture with a specialty in semantics. His first degree was in general linguistics at the University of Amsterdam, and his PhD was completed at the University of Groningen in 1986 with the dissertation Categoriale grammatica en algebraïsche semantiek; een onderzoek naar negatie en polariteit in het Nederlands (Categorial grammar and algebraic semantics: An investigation of negation and polarity in Dutch). He was appointed professor of Dutch linguistics in Groningen in 1987, and was scientific director of the research school (onderzoekschool) Behavioral & Cognitive Neurosciences (BCN) from 1999 until 2002, when he was elected rector magnificus. He is the president of the National Dyslexia Commission and member of the Royal Netherlands Academy of Arts and Sciences (KNAW).

He is best known for his work on negation and polarity, in particular the so-called Zwarts hierarchy of polarity items. This hierarchy recognizes three types of polarity items: weak items, acceptable in all downward-entailing contexts, strong items, acceptable in anti-additive contexts and superstrong items, acceptable in antimorphic contexts. See Zwarts (1998). Other work includes a study of the relational properties of determiners (a contribution to generalized quantifier theory), Zwarts (1983), and a paper on extraction from prepositional phrases in Dutch (Zwarts 1978). More recent work includes a number of publications on dyslexia and neurolinguistics.

Zwarts is member of the Royal Netherlands Academy of Arts and Sciences since 1999.

== See also ==
- Negative polarity
