= Subtrigging =

Modification of words for free choice items

In formal semantics, subtrigging is the phenomenon whereby free choice items in episodic sentences require a modifier. For instance, the following sentence is not acceptable in English.

1. *Any student signed the petition.

However, the sentence can be repaired by adding a post-nominal modifier such as a relative clause, prepositional phrase, or locative.

1. Any student who went to the meeting signed the petition. (RC)
2. Any student at the meeting signed the petition. (PP)
3. Any student there signed the petition. (locative)

== See also ==
- Free choice inference
- Linguistic modality
- Negative polarity item
