= Homogeneity (semantics) =

Semantic property of plurals

In formal semantics, homogeneity is the phenomenon where plural expressions that seem to mean "all" negate to "none" rather than "not all". For example, the English sentence "Robin read the books" requires Robin to have read all of the books, while "Robin didn't read the books" requires her to have read none of them. Neither sentence is true if she read exactly half of the books. Homogeneity effects have been observed in a variety of languages including Japanese, Russian, and Hungarian. Semanticists have proposed a variety of explanations for homogeneity, often involving a combination of presupposition, plural quantification, and trivalent logics. Because analogous effects have been observed with conditionals and other modal expressions, some semanticists have proposed that these phenomena involve pluralities of possible worlds.

== Overview ==
Homogeneous interpretations arise when a plural expression seems to mean "all" when asserted but "none" when negated. For example, the English sentence in (1a) is typically interpreted to mean that Robin read all the books, while (1b) is interpreted to mean that she read none of them. This is a puzzle since (1b) would merely mean that some books went unread if "the books" expressed universal quantification, as it appears to do in the positive sentence.

(1) Homogeneity with definite plurals:

a. Robin read the books.
b. Robin didn't read the books.

Homogeneous readings are also possible with other expressions including conjunctions and bare plurals. For instance, (2a) means that Robin read both books while (2b) means that she read neither; example (3a) means that in general Robin likes books while (3b) means that in general she does not.

(2) Homogeneity with conjunctions:

a. Robin read Syntactic Structures and Twilight.
b. Robin didn't read Syntactic Structures and Twilight.

(3) Homogeneity with bare plurals:

a. Robin likes books.
b. Robin doesn't like books.

Homogeneity effects have been studied in a variety of languages including English, Russian, Japanese and Hungarian. For instance, the Hungarian example in (4) behaves analogously to the English one in (1b).

(4) Nem látta a lányokat.

"He didn’t see the girls"

== Suspensions ==
Homogeneity can be suspended in certain circumstances. For instance, the definite plurals in (1) lose their homogeneous interpretation when an overt universal quantifier is inserted, as shown in (5).

(5) No Homogeneity with "all" and a definite plural:

a. Robin read all the books
b. Robin didn’t read all the books

Additionally, the conjunctions in (3) lose their homogeneous interpretation when the connective receives focus.

(6) Homogeneity with conjunctions:

a. Robin read Syntactic Structures AND Twilight.
b. Robin didn't read Syntactic Structures AND Twilight.

== Theories ==
Homogeneity is important to semantic theory in part because it results in apparent truth value gaps. For example, neither of the sentences in (1) are assertable if Robin read exactly half of the relevant books. As a result, some linguists have attempted to provide unified analyses with other gappy phenomena such as presupposition, scalar implicature, free choice inferences, and vagueness. Homogeneity effects have been argued to appear with semantic types other than individuals. For instance, negated conditionals and modals have been argued to show similar effects, potentially suggesting that they refer to pluralities of possible worlds.

== See also ==
- Free choice inference
- Cumulativity (linguistics)
- Law of excluded middle
- Predication (philosophy)
- Trivalent logic
