= Peter Poellner =

German philosopher

Peter Poellner is a professor of philosophy at the University of Warwick. His research interests include phenomenology, philosophy of value, philosophy of mind, Husserl, Nietzsche.

According to Brian Leiter, he has challenged the view that libertarian views of free will and moral responsibility are central to Western religious, moral, and cultural traditions.

== Publications ==
- Value in Modernity: The Philosophy of Existential Modernism in Nietzsche, Scheler, Sartre, Musil. New York: Oxford University Press, (2022).
- Myth and the Making of Modernity: The Problem of Grounding in Early Twentieth-Century Literature (1998).
- Nietzsche and Metaphysics. New York: Oxford University Press (1995).
