= Michael Lewis (philosopher) =

British philosopher

- Born: 9 November 1977 (age 48)

Education
- Education: University of Warwick (BA & PhD); University of Essex (MA)
- Thesis: Being-with and the Place of Ethics (2004)
- Doctoral advisor: Miguel de Beistegui

Philosophical work
- Era: 21st-century philosophy
- Region: Western philosophy
- School: Continental
- Institutions: Newcastle University
- Main interests: post-Kantian philosophy

Michael Andrew Lewis (born 9 November 1977) is a British philosopher. He is the co-founder and general editor of the Journal of Italian Philosophy. Lewis is known for his expertise on continental philosophy.

== Books ==
- The Beautiful Animal: Sincerity, Charm, and the Fossilised Dialectic, Rowman and Littlefield, 2018
- Phenomenology: An Introduction, with Tanja Staehler, Continuum, 2010
- Derrida and Lacan: Another Writing, Edinburgh University Press, 2008
- Heidegger Beyond Deconstruction: On Nature, Bloomsbury, 2007
- Heidegger and the Place of Ethics: Being-with in the Crossing of Heidegger's Thought, Bloomsbury, 2005
