= Keith Ansell-Pearson =

British philosopher

- Born: 1960 (age 65–66)

Philosophical work
- Era: Contemporary philosophy
- Region: Western philosophy
- School: Continental philosophy
- Institutions: University of Warwick; University of London

Keith Ansell-Pearson (born 1960) is a British philosopher specialising in the work of Friedrich Nietzsche, Henri Bergson and Gilles Deleuze. He is currently Emeritus Professor of Philosophy at Warwick University.

Ansell-Pearson is the author of numerous books, including Germinal Life, Viroid Life and Philosophy and the Adventure of the Virtual.

== Career ==
Ansell-Pearson graduated from the University of Sussex and taught at the University of Malawi in southern Africa and Queen Mary College in London. He joined the Philosophy Department of the University of Warwick in 1993, where he held a Personal Chair between 1998 and his retirement in 2021.

He is on the editorial boards of Journal of Nietzsche Studies, Nietzsche-Studien, Deleuze Studies, Cosmos and History and the book series Nietzsche Now. He serves on the scientific committee of Nietzscheana.

== Work ==
Ansell-Pearson is known for his work on Nietzsche, Bergson, and Deleuze, and for exploring their work in the context of modern biophilosophy. Lately he has been focusing on Nietzsche's neglected middle period texts, especially Daybreak.

== Selected bibliography ==
- Nietzsche and Modern German Thought. London: Routledge. 1991. ISBN 978-0-415-04442-4.
- Nietzsche Contra Rousseau: A Study of Nietzsche's Moral and Political Thought. Cambridge; New York: Cambridge University Press. 1991. ISBN 978-0-521-41173-8.
- An Introduction to Nietzsche as Political Thinker: The Perfect Nihilist. Cambridge; New York: Cambridge University Press. 1994. ISBN 978-0-521-42721-0.
- Nietzsche Contra Rousseau: A Study of Nietzsche's Moral and Political Thought. Cambridge; New York: Cambridge University Press. 1996. ISBN 978-0-521-57569-0.
- Deleuze and Philosophy: The Difference Engineer. London: Routledge. 1997. ISBN 978-0-415-14269-4.
- Viroid Life: Perspectives on Nietzsche and the Transhuman Condition. London: Routledge. 1997. ISBN 978-0-415-15435-2.
- Germinal Life: The Difference and Repetition of Deleuze. London: Routledge. 1998. ISBN 978-0-415-18351-2.
- Philosophy and the Adventure of the Virtual: Bergson and the Time of Life. London: Routledge. 2002. ISBN 9780203469361.
- A Companion to Nietzsche. Oxford: Blackwell. 2006. ISBN 978-1-4051-1622-0.
- Nietzsche's Search for Philosophy: On the Middle Writings. London: Bloomsbury. 2018. ISBN 9781474254700.
- Bergson: Thinking Beyond the Human Condition. London: Bloomsbury. 2018. ISBN 978-1350043954.
