= Christoph Hoerl =

German philosopher

Education
- Education: Oxford University (PhD)
- Thesis: Keeping track of time :time, thought and memory (1996)
- Doctoral advisor: Adrian Moore, John Campbell, Martin Davies

Philosophical work
- Era: 21st-century philosophy
- Region: Western philosophy
- School: Analytic
- Institutions: University of Warwick
- Main interests: philosophy of mind and philosophy of psychology

Christoph Hoerl (born 1967) is a German philosopher and Professor of Philosophy at the University of Warwick where he is also Deputy Head of Department of Philosophy. He is known for his works on philosophy of mind and philosophy of psychology.

== Books ==
- Time and Memory: Issues in Philosophy and Psychology , edited with Teresa McCormack, Oxford University Press, 2001
- N. Eilan, C. Hoerl, T. McCormack & J. Roessler (eds.) (2005): Joint Attention: Communication and Other Minds: Issues in Philosophy and Psychology, Oxford University Press*
- C. Hoerl, T. McCormack & S. Beck (eds.) (2011): Understanding Counterfactuals, Understanding Causation: Issues in Philosophy and Psychology. Oxford University Press
- T. McCormack, C. Hoerl & S. Butterfill (eds.) (2011): Tool Use and Causal Cognition: Issues in Philosophy and Psychology. Oxford University Pre
