= Polarity item =

Lexical item associated with affirmation or negation

In grammar and linguistics, a polarity item is a lexical item that is associated with affirmation or negation. An affirmation is a positive polarity item, abbreviated PPI or AFF. A negation is a negative polarity item, abbreviated NPI or NEG.

The linguistic environment in which a polarity item appears is a licensing context. In the simplest case, an affirmative statement provides a licensing context for a PPI, while negation provides a licensing context for an NPI. However, there are many complications, and not all polarity items of a particular type have the same licensing contexts.

== In English ==
As examples of polarity items, consider the English lexical items somewhat and at all, as used in the following sentences:

1. I liked the film somewhat.
2. I didn't like the film at all.
3. *I liked the film at all.
4. *I didn't like the film somewhat.

As can be seen, somewhat is licensed by the affirmative environment of sentence (1), but it is forbidden (anti-licensed) by the negative environment of sentence (4). It can therefore be considered to be a positive polarity item (PPI). On the other hand, at all is licensed by the negative environment of sentence (2), but anti-licensed by the positive environment of sentence (3), and is therefore considered a negative polarity item (NPI).

Because standard English does not have negative concord, that is, double negatives are not used to intensify each other, the language makes frequent use of certain NPIs that correspond in meaning to negative items, and can be used in the environment of another negative. For example, anywhere is an NPI corresponding to the negative nowhere, as used in the following sentences:

1. I was going nowhere. (the negative nowhere is used when not preceded by another negative)
2. I was not going anywhere. (the NPI anywhere is used in the environment of the preceding negative not)

Note that double-negative constructions like I was not going nowhere take on an opposing meaning in formal usage, but that this is not necessarily the case in colloquial contexts and in various lects, which parallels other languages which have negative concord. Anywhere, like most of the other NPIs listed below, is also used in other senses where it is not an NPI, as in I would go anywhere with you.

- nobody/no one – anybody/anyone
- nothing – anything
- no/none – any
- never – ever
- nowhere – anywhere
- no longer/no more – any longer/any more

See also English grammar § Negation, and Affirmation and negation § Multiple negation.

== Determination of licensing contexts ==
The actual set of contexts that license particular polarity items is not as easily defined as a simple distinction between affirmative and negative sentences. Baker noted that double negation may provide an acceptable context for positive polarity items:

I can't believe you don't fancy her somewhat.

John doesn't have any potatoes
*John has any potatoes.

However, licensing contexts can take many forms besides simple negation/affirmation. To complicate matters, polarity items appear to be highly idiosyncratic, each with its own set of licensing contexts.

Early discussion of polarity items can be found in the work of Otto Jespersen and Edward Klima. Much of the research on polarity items has centered around the question of what creates a negative context. In the late 1970s, William Ladusaw (building on work by Gilles Fauconnier) discovered that most English NPIs are licensed in downward entailing environments. This is known as the Fauconnier–Ladusaw hypothesis. A downward entailing environment, however, is not a necessary condition for an NPI to be licensed—they may be licensed by some non-monotone (and thus not downward entailing) contexts, like "exactly N," as well.

*Some people have ever been on the moon.
Exactly three people have ever been on the moon.

Nor is a downward entailing environment a sufficient condition for all negative polarity items, as first pointed out by Zwarts (1981) for Dutch "ook maar."

Licensing contexts across languages include the scope of n-words (negative particles, negative quantifiers), the antecedent of conditionals, questions, the restrictor of universal quantifiers, non-affirmative verbs (doubt), adversative predicates (be surprised), negative conjunctions (without), comparatives and superlatives, too-phrases, negative predicates (unlikely), some subjunctive complements, some disjunctions, imperatives, and others (finally, only). Given that many of these environments are not strictly downward entailing, alternative licensing conditions have been proposed building on concepts such as Strawson entailment and nonveridicality (proposed by Zwarts and Giannakidou).

Different NPIs may be licensed by different expressions. Thus, while the NPI anything is licensed by the downward entailing expression at most two of the visitors, the idiomatic NPI not lift a finger (known as a minimizer) is not licensed by the same expression.

At most two of the visitors had seen anything.
*At most two of the visitors lifted a finger to help.

While NPIs have been discovered in many languages, their distribution is subject to substantial cross-linguistic variation; this aspect of NPIs is currently the subject of ongoing research in cross-linguistic semantics.

== See also ==
- Downward entailing
- Generalized quantifier
- Grammatical polarity
- Subtrigging
- Veridicality
