= List of Guggenheim Fellowships awarded in 2019 =

List of Guggenheim Fellowships awarded in 2019: Guggenheim Fellowships have been awarded annually since 1925, by the John Simon Guggenheim Memorial Foundation to those "who have demonstrated exceptional capacity for productive scholarship or exceptional creative ability in the arts." The John Simon Guggenheim Memorial Foundation approved the awarding of 168 Guggenheim Fellowships, chosen from a group of almost 3,000 applicants in the Foundation’s ninety-fifth competition.

Fellow	Category	Field of Study
Rachel Adams	Humanities	Literary Criticism
Samuel Adams	Creative Arts	Music Composition
Ann Cooper Albright	Humanities	Dance Studies
Cecilia Aldarondo	Creative Arts	Film - Video
Ben Altman	Creative Arts	Photography
Branka Arsić	Humanities	American Literature
Anna Badkhen	Creative Arts	General Nonfiction
William Balée	Social Sciences	Geography and Environmental Studies
Yevgeniya Baras	Creative Arts	Fine Arts
Lisa Feldman Barrett	Natural Sciences	Neuroscience
Kimberly Bartosik	Creative Arts	Choreography
Eric Baudelaire	Creative Arts	Film - Video
Lauren Benton	Humanities	European and Latin American History
Susanna Berger	Humanities	Fine Arts Research
Hester Blum	Social Sciences	Geography and Environmental Studies
Michael K. Bourdaghs	Humanities	East Asian Studies
Julia Bryan-Wilson	Humanities	Fine Arts Research
Sean Buckelew	Creative Arts	Film - Video
Dora Budor	Creative Arts	Fine Arts
Julie Buffalohead	Creative Arts	Fine Arts
Ian Burney	Humanities	History of Science, Technology and Economics
Agnes Callard	Humanities	Philosophy
Edward Carey	Creative Arts	Fiction
David Carey Jr.	Humanities	European and Latin American History
Cyrus Cassells	Creative Arts	Poetry
Christiane Cegavske	Creative Arts	Film - Video
Thomas Centolella	Creative Arts	Poetry
Alexandra Chasin	Creative Arts	General Nonfiction
Gennaro Chierchia	Humanities	Linguistics
Michael W. Clune	Humanities	Literary Criticism
Catherine Conybeare	Humanities	Classics
Carl Corey	Creative Arts	Photography
Mark Danner	Creative Arts	General Nonfiction
Sandeep Das	Creative Arts	Music Composition
Barbara Davidson	Creative Arts	Photography
Elena del Rivero	Creative Arts	Fine Arts
Brian DeLay	Humanities	U.S. History
Neal K. Devaraj	Natural Sciences	Biology
Janine di Giovanni	Creative Arts	General Nonfiction
Jessica Dimmock	Creative Arts	Film - Video
Mark Dion	Creative Arts	Fine Arts
Daniel Duford	Creative Arts	Fine Arts
Camille T. Dungy	Creative Arts	Poetry
Pascaline Dupas	Social Sciences	Economics
Glenn Dynner	Humanities	Religion
Jessica Eaton	Creative Arts	Photography
Miguel P. Eckstein	Social Sciences	Psychology
Patricia Engel	Creative Arts	Fiction
Georg Essl	Natural Sciences	Computer Science
Merion Estes	Creative Arts	Fine Arts
Jed Esty	Humanities	Literary Criticism
Suzanne Farrin	Creative Arts	Music Composition
Yance Ford	Creative Arts	Film - Video
Massimo Franceschetti	Natural Sciences	Engineering
Dara Friedman	Creative Arts	Film - Video
Alexander R. Galloway	Humanities	Film, Video, & New Media Studies
Marjorie Garber	Humanities	English Literature
Mariah Garnett	Creative Arts	Film - Video
Jennifer Garza-Cuen	Creative Arts	Photography
Colin Gee	Creative Arts	Choreography
Carmen Giménez Smith	Creative Arts	Poetry
Guillermo Gómez-Peña	Creative Arts	Drama and Performance Art
Mark Grieco	Creative Arts	Film - Video
Hugh Gusterson	Social Sciences	Anthropology and Cultural Studies
Mohammad T. Hajiaghayi	Natural Sciences	Applied Mathematics
Jane Hammond	Creative Arts	Fine Arts
Karen Hartman	Creative Arts	Drama and Performance Art
Michael Helm	Creative Arts	Fiction
Elliott Hundley	Creative Arts	Fine Arts
Lawrence P. Jackson	Creative Arts	General Nonfiction
David Jerison	Natural Sciences	Mathematics
Richard R. John	Humanities	U.S. History
Matthew Johnson	Social Sciences	Anthropology and Cultural Studies
Daniel Alexander Jones	Creative Arts	Drama and Performance Art
Ron Jude	Creative Arts	Photography
Mark Jurdjevic	Humanities	Medieval and Renaissance History
Peter Kayafas	Creative Arts	Photography
Ari Kelman	Humanities	U.S. History
Ibram X. Kendi	Humanities	U.S. History
Joanna Klink	Creative Arts	Poetry
Jo Kreiter	Creative Arts	Choreography
Kevin M. Kruse	Creative Arts	General Nonfiction
Catherine Lacey	Creative Arts	Fiction
Kathya Maria Landeros	Creative Arts	Photography
Fabienne Lasserre	Creative Arts	Fine Arts
Elisabeth Le Guin	Humanities	Music Research
Robin Coste Lewis	Creative Arts	Poetry
Pontus Lidberg	Creative Arts	Choreography
Hong Liu	Natural Sciences	Physics
Michelle Lopez	Creative Arts	Fine Arts
Carmen Maria Machado	Creative Arts	Fiction
Matteo Maggiori	Social Sciences	Economics
J.G. Manning	Humanities	Near Eastern Studies
Guadalupe Maravilla	Creative Arts	Fine Arts
Daniel Joseph Martinez	Creative Arts	Fine Arts
Matthew Mazzotta	Creative Arts	Fine Arts
Brigid McCaffrey	Creative Arts	Film - Video
Suzanne McClelland	Creative Arts	Fine Arts
Tiona Nekkia McClodden	Creative Arts	Fine Arts
Ann McCoy	Creative Arts	Fine Arts
Shane McCrae	Creative Arts	Poetry
Anne McNeil	Natural Sciences	Chemistry
Maryrose Cobarrubias Mendoza	Creative Arts	Fine Arts
Christopher Merrill	Creative Arts	General Nonfiction
Suzanne Mettler	Social Sciences	Political Science
Elizabeth Carolyn Miller	Humanities	English Literature
Seth Mnookin	Natural Sciences	Science Writing
Erik Mueggler	Social Sciences	Anthropology and Cultural Studies
Per A. Mykland	Natural Sciences	Applied Mathematics
Constance Allen Nathanson	Social Sciences	Sociology
Scott Reynolds Nelson	Humanities	U.S. History
Andrew Newman	Social Sciences	Education
Todd H. Oakley	Natural Sciences	Biology
Catherine Opie	Creative Arts	Photography
Sylvan Oswald	Creative Arts	Drama and Performance Art
Zeena Parkins	Creative Arts	Music Composition
Gerard Passannante	Humanities	Medieval and Renaissance Literature
John Durham Peters	Creative Arts	Film, Video, & New Media Studies
Adriana Petryna	Social Sciences	Anthropology and Cultural Studies
Robert B. Pippin	Humanities	Philosophy
Sam Pluta	Creative Arts	Music Composition
James I. Porter	Humanities	Classics
Matthew Porterfield	Creative Arts	Film - Video
Janet L. Pritchard	Creative Arts	Photography
Lincoln Quillian	Social Sciences	Sociology
Dean Rader	Creative Arts	Poetry
Benita Raphan	Creative Arts	Film
Henry S. Richardson	Humanities	Philosophy
Matthew Ricketts	Creative Arts	Music Composition
Katharina Rosenberger	Creative Arts	Music Composition
Helena Rosenblatt	Humanities	Intellectual and Cultural History
Steve Rowell	Creative Arts	Film - Video
Christopher Rudd	Creative Arts	Choreography
Edmund Russell	Humanities	History of Science, Technology and Economics
Lena Salaymeh	Social Sciences	Law
Aki Sasamoto	Creative Arts	Fine Arts
Ronald Schechter	Humanities	Intellectual and Cultural History
Peter J. Schmelz	Humanities	Music Research
Helen Schulman	Creative Arts	Fiction
Lloyd Schwartz	Creative Arts	Poetry
Peggy Shaw	Creative Arts	Drama and Performance Art
Cassim Shepard	Humanities	Architecture, Planning and Design
Jim Shrosbree	Creative Arts	Fine Arts
Jen Shyu	Creative Arts	Music Composition
Douglas Smith	Humanities	Translation
Brad Snyder	Social Sciences	Constitutional Studies
Miriam Solomon	Humanities	Philosophy
Snežana Stanimirović	Natural Sciences	Astronomy and Astrophysics
Noa Steimatsky	Humanities	Film, Video, & New Media Studies
Sam Stephenson	Creative Arts	General Nonfiction
Jeffrey Stockbridge	Creative Arts	Photography
Christopher Trapani	Creative Arts	Music Composition
Thorsten Trimpop	Creative Arts	Film - Video
Hồng-Ân Trương	Creative Arts	Fine Arts
Richard Tuck	Social Sciences	Political Science
Fatimah Tuggar	Creative Arts	Fine Arts
Luis Alberto Urrea	Creative Arts	Fiction
Manuel Valera	Creative Arts	Music Composition
James Vernon	Humanities	European and Latin American History
Ilya Vinitsky	Humanities	Intellectual and Cultural History
Lothar von Falkenhausen	Humanities	East Asian Studies
Ittai Weinryb	Humanities	Fine Arts Research
Matthew White	Creative Arts	Music Composition
Entang Wiharso	Creative Arts	Fine Arts
Carmen Winant	Creative Arts	Photography
Patricia Wittkopp	Natural Sciences	Biology
Carrie Yamaoka	Creative Arts	Fine Arts
Deborah Zlotsky	Creative Arts	Fine Arts
