= Quillian =

Quillian is a surname. Notable people with this surname include:

- Lincoln Quillian, American sociologist
- Natalie Quillian, American political strategist
- Ronnie Quillian (1934–2016), Canadian football player
- Sylvie Quillian (born 1980), Canadian curler
- William Quillian (disambiguation), several people
