= In Jerusalem =

- Directed by: David Perlov
- Produced by: The Israeli Film Service
- Starring: Zelda
- Narrated by: Yaacov Malkin
- Cinematography: Adam Greenberg
- Music by: Oedoen Partos, conducted by Gary Bertini
- Release date: 1963
- Running time: 33 minutes
- Country: Israel
- Language: Hebrew

In Jerusalem (Bi-rushalayim, Jerusalem) (1963) is a documentary film by David Perlov. This film came to be one of the most important films of Israeli documentary cinema.

Considered by many as one of the most poetic Israeli films, and a milestone in Israeli documentary cinema, In Jerusalem is composed of 10 engaged observations of the city, before it was united. Uri Klein (Haaretz) wrote: "When I first saw In Jerusalem, in 1963, I was not fully aware yet of the importance of the film itself or of its director, but I knew that I had never seen an Israeli film such as that. I felt that the Israeli cinema was being born right in front of my eyes".

== Awards ==
- Venice Festival 1963, bronze medal
- 'Director of the Year', Van Leer Institute

== Footsteps in Jerusalem ==
In 2013, 50 years after In Jerusalem, and inspired by Perlov, leading filmmakers from the Sam Spiegel Film and Television School tell their story using their own personal perspective. Nine select films were curated with the original In Jerusalem to form a new, inter-generational film about a city that has dramatically changed – politically, demographically, economically and culturally. Directed by: David Perlov, Dan Geva, David Ofek, Nadav Lapid, Benjamin Freidenberg, Moran Ifergan, Yarden Karmin, Amichai Chasson and Elad Schwartz, Boaz Frankel and Yair Agmon, Nayef Hammoud and Yotam Kislev.
