= Veneeta Dayal =

American linguist

Veneeta Dayal (born December 5, 1956) is an American linguist. She is currently the Dorothy R. Diebold Professor of Linguistics at Yale University.

== Education and research ==
Dayal was born in India. She received a BA, MA, and MPhil in English literature from Delhi University. She earned a PhD in Linguistics from Cornell University in 1991, under the supervision of Gennaro Chierchia. Before taking up a position at Yale, she was on the faculty of Rutgers University, where she served as department chair from 2005 to 2008 and acting dean of humanities in the School of Arts and Sciences from 2008 to 2009.

Dayal's research focuses on the interface of semantics and syntax, especially the areas of question forms and relative clauses, bare nominals and genericity, and quantifier words signalling free choice, such as "any." She has examined these forms in data from Hindi as well as English.

== Awards and distinctions ==
Since 2012 she has been an associate editor for the journal Linguistics and Philosophy.

She was awarded a Fulbright Senior Research Award for 2004- 2005: “South Asian Languages and Semantic Variation: A Cross-Linguistic Study” for research on classifiers in South Asian languages.

In 2002-2003, she was awarded a National Science Foundation grant, “Quantification without Quantifiers,” to study the meaning conveyed by nouns without articles in English, Korean, Hebrew, and Hindi.

== Selected publications ==
- 2013. “Bangla Plural Classifiers,” Language and Linguistics 15.1.
- 2013. “On the Existential Force of Bare Plurals Across Languages,” I. Caponigro and C.Cecchetto (eds.) From Grammar to Meaning: The Spontaneous Logicality of Language, Cambridge University Press.
- 2013. “A Viability Constraint on Alternatives for Free Choice," in A. Falaus (ed) Alternatives in Semantics, Palgrave. 2013d. “The syntax of scope and quantification”, den Dikken (ed), The Cambridge Handbook of Generative Syntax.
- 2012. “Bangla Classifiers: Mediating between Kinds and Objects," Rivista di Linguistica/Italian Journal of Linguistics 24.2.3
- 2011. “Bare Noun Phrases," Survey Paper, in Maienborn, von Heusinger and Portner (Eds.), Semantics: An International Handbook of Natural Language Meaning, 33.2 Mouton de Gruyter (HSK series).
- 2011. “Hindi Pseudo Incorporation," Natural Language and Linguistic Theory 29.1.
- 2010. Veneeta Dayal & Roger Schwarzschild. “Definite Inner Antecedents and Wh-Correlates in Sluices,” in Starverov, Peter, Daniel Altshuler, Aaron Braver, Carlos Fasola and Sarah Murray (eds) Rutgers Working Papers in Linguistics.
- 2009. “Variation in English Free Choice Items,” in Mohanty, Rajat and Mythili Menon (eds) Universals and Variation: Proceedings of GLOW in AsiaVII.
- 2009. “Semantic Variation and Pleonastic Determiners: The Case of the Plural Definite Generic," in Nguyen Chi Duy Khuong, Richa and Samar Sinha (eds.) The Fifth Asian GLOW: Conference Proceedings, CIIL (Mysore) and FOSSSIL (New Delhi).
- 2007. Rajesh Bhatt and Veneeta Dayal. “Rightward Scrambling as Rightward Remnant Movement,” Linguistic Inquiry (Remarks and Replies) 38.2: 287–301.
- 2005. “Multiple-Wh-Questions,” in M. Everaert and H. van Riemsdijk (eds.) The Blackwell Companion to Syntax, Volume 3, pp. 275–326, Blackwell Publishing.
- 2004. "Licensing by Modification," Ilha Do Desterro, special issue on Semantics: Lexicon, Grammar and Use, a Brazilian journal on language/linguistics, literature, and cultural studies in English.
- 2004. “The Universal Force of FC ‘Any’,” Linguistic Variation Yearbook4.
- 2004. “Number Marking and (In)definiteness in Kind Terms,” Linguistics and Philosophy 27.4.
- 2003. “Two Types of Universal Terms in Questions,” (reprint of 1992 paper) in Javier Gutiérrez-Rexach (ed) Semantics: Critical Concepts, Routledge.
- 2003. “Bare Nominals: Non-specific and Contrastive Readings under Scrambling," in Simin Karimi (ed.) Word Order and Scrambling, Blackwell Publishers.
- 2002. “Single-pair vs. Multiple-pair Answers: Wh in-situ and Scope," Linguistic Inquiry Squibs 33.3.
- 2000. “Scope Marking: Cross-linguistic Variation in Indirect Dependency," in U. Lutz, G. Mueller and A. von Stechow (eds.) Wh-Scope Marking, John Benjamins.
- 1999. “Bare NP’s, Reference to Kinds, and Incorporation,” Proceedings of Semantics and Linguistic Theory IX.
- 1998. "Any as Inherently Modal," Linguistics and Philosophy 21.5.
- 1997. “Free Relatives and Ever: Identity and Free Choice Readings,” Proceedings of Semantics and Linguistic Theory VII.
- 1996. Locality in WH Quantification. Kluwer.
- 1995. "Quantification in Correlatives," in Emmon Bach, Eloise Jelinek, Angelika Kratzer and Barbara Partee (eds) Quantification in Natural Language, Kluwer Academic Press: Dordrecht.
- 1994. "Binding Facts in Hindi and the Scrambling Phenomenon," in M. Butt, T. King and G. Ramchand (eds) Theoretical Perspectives on Word Order Issues in South Asian Languages, CSLI: Stanford.
- 1994. "Scope Marking as Indirect Wh Dependency,” Natural Language Semantics, 2.2.
- 1994. "Arbitrary UapnaaU," South Asian Language Review, 4.1 pp. 75–88. With Wayne Harbert.
- 1993. "Restrictive Relativization in Hindi," South Asian Language Review 3.1.
- 1993. "Scope marking as indirect wh-dependency," Natural Language Semantics.
- 1991. "Subjacency Effects at LF: The Case of Hindi WH," Linguistic Inquiry 22.4.
- 1991. "The Syntax and Semantics of Correlatives," Natural Language and Linguistic Theory 9.4.
