= Adam Greenberg (cinematographer) =

Israeli-American cinematographer (1937–2025)

- אדם גרינברג
- Born: April 11, 1937; Kraków, Poland
- Died: October 31, 2025 (aged 88); Los Angeles, California, U.S.
- Occupation: Cinematographer
- Years active: 1963–2017

Adam Greenberg, A.S.C. (Hebrew: אדם גרינברג; April 11, 1937 – October 31, 2025) was an Israeli-American cinematographer.

Greenberg was noted for his work in Israeli and American productions, including several action films starring Arnold Schwarzenegger, most notably the first two Terminator movies, which the sequel earned him a nomination at the Academy Award for Best Cinematography.

In 1999, he was a member of the jury at the 21st Moscow International Film Festival.

== Life and career ==
Greenberg was raised in Tel Aviv. He began work as a film lab technician in 1958. While working as a newsreel and cameraman in the early 1960s, he worked with filmmaker David Perlov on his 33-minute documentary In Jerusalem (בירושלים, Be-Yerushalayim).

His first job as director of photography came in the form of The Flying Matchmaker, an Israeli musical film based on an operetta by Abraham Goldfaden. The film was selected as the Israeli entry into the Academy Awards for Best Foreign Language Film, but was ultimately not nominated. Greenberg shot several well-received and popular films in Israel, soon becoming one of the most noteworthy individuals in the country's film industry, beginning a long-term collaboration with prolific filmmaking duo Menahem Golan and Yoram Globus. Their coming-of-age comedy drama Lemon Popsicle was a massive success, quickly becoming the highest-grossing film in Israeli history and spawning numerous sequels and spin-offs. Greenberg's first American film was the 1980 World War II epic, shot on location in Israel and Ireland, The Big Red One. Afterwards, Greenberg emigrated to the United States, gaining citizenship three years later. Though he worked almost exclusively in Hollywood thereafter, he continued to work with Golan-Globus for years.

In 1982, Greenberg shot The Last American Virgin, an English-language remake of Lemon Popsicle with much of the same creative team. The film failed to match the same level of success as its predecessor however, and the planned sequels failed to materialize. Two years later, he shot the James Cameron-directed science fiction action film The Terminator, which became an unexpected success with both critics and audiences, spawning a highly-profitable franchise and propelling its star Arnold Schwarzenegger to film stardom. Greenberg went on to become a highly prolific director of photography, working primarily in the comedy and thriller genres. Some of these films include the military action film Iron Eagle, the cult vampire Western Near Dark, the neo-noir science fiction thriller Alien Nation, the Best Picture-nominated romantic fantasy film Ghost, Three Men and a Baby, and Sister Act.

In 1991, Greenberg worked with James Cameron on Terminator 2: Judgment Day, the sequel to The Terminator. It was a massive success both critically and financially, winning four Academy Awards (Best Makeup, Best Sound, Best Sound Effects Editing and Best Visual Effects), as well as two BAFTAs. The film earned over $519 million worldwide and remains one of the highest grossing films of all time. Greenberg received an Oscar nomination for Best Cinematography for his work on the film. This was his second time working with Arnold Schwarzenegger, and the two went on to collaborate several more times with Junior, Eraser, and Collateral Damage.

Greenberg's last film had him returning to his native Israel with Footsteps in Jerusalem, an homage to David Perlov that combined In Jerusalem with nine other short documentaries as a means to explore the massive changes Jerusalem has undergone through the decades.

He re-teamed with director James Cameron to oversee the 3-D conversion of Terminator 2 in 2017.

Greenberg died in Los Angeles on October 31, 2025, at the age of 88.

== Filmography ==
=== Film ===
Short film

| Year | Title | Director | Notes |
|---|---|---|---|
| 1963 | In Jerusalem | David Perlov | Documentary short |
| 1967 | Slower | Avraham Heffner | |
| 1967 | Theatre in Israel | David Perlov | Documentary short |

Feature film

| Year | Title | Director | Notes |
|---|---|---|---|
| 1969 | Before Tomorrow | Ellida Geira | With Amnon Salomon |
| 1969 | 42:6 - Ben Gurion | David Perlov | With Erwin Hillier |
| 1970 | Madron | Jerry Hopper | With Marcel Grignon |
| 1971 | Hasamba | Joel Silberg | |
| 1972 | Metzitzim | Uri Zohar | |
| 1972 | I Love You Rosa | Moshé Mizrahi | |
| 1972 | The Other Side | Baruch Dienar | With Baruch Dienar |
| 1972 | The Pill | David Perlov | |
| 1973 | The House on Chelouche Street | Moshé Mizrahi | |
| 1973 | Daughters, Daughters | Moshé Mizrahi | |
| 1974 | My Michael | Dan Wolman | |
| 1975 | Diamonds | Menahem Golan | |
| 1976 | The Passover Plot | Michael Campus | |
| 1977 | Operation Thunderbolt | Menahem Golan | |
| 1977 | Warhead | John O'Connor | |
| 1977 | Movie and Breakfast | Alfred Steinhardt | |
| 1977 | Five Hundred Thousand Black | Shaike Ophir | |
| 1978 | Lemon Popsicle | Boaz Davidson | |
| 1978 | The Uranium Conspiracy | Gianfranco Baldanello; Menahem Golan | With Antonio Modica |
| 1978 | Funny Israelis | Tzvi Shissel | |
| 1978 | Belfer | Yigal Bursztyn | |
| 1979 | Going Steady | Boaz Davidson | |
| 1980 | The Big Red One | Samuel Fuller | |
| 1980 | Seed of Innocence | Boaz Davidson | |
| 1982 | Paradise | Stuart Gillard | |
| 1982 | Safari 3000 | Harry Hurwitz | |
| 1982 | The Last American Virgin | Boaz Davidson | |
| 1982 | Private Popsicle | Boaz Davidson | |
| 1983 | 10 to Midnight | J. Lee Thompson | |
| 1983 | Private Manoeuvres | Tzvi Shissel | |
| 1984 | Over the Brooklyn Bridge | Menahem Golan | |
| 1984 | The Terminator | James Cameron | |
| 1984 | The Ambassador | J. Lee Thompson | |
| 1985 | Private Resort | George Bowers | |
| 1985 | War and Love | Moshé Mizrahi | |
| 1985 | Once Bitten | Howard Storm | |
| 1985 | The Ladies Club | Janet Greek | |
| 1986 | Iron Eagle | Sidney J. Furie | |
| 1986 | Jocks | Steve Carver | |
| 1986 | Howard the Duck | Willard Huyck | |
| 1986 | Wisdom | Emilio Estevez | |
| 1987 | A Walk on the Moon | Raphael D. Silver | |
| 1987 | La Bamba | Luis Valdez | |
| 1987 | Near Dark | Kathryn Bigelow | |
| 1987 | Three Men and a Baby | Leonard Nimoy | |
| 1988 | Spellbinder | Janet Greek | |
| 1988 | Alien Nation | Graham Baker | |
| 1988 | Lool | Boaz Davidson; Uri Zohar | With David Gurfinkel |
| 1989 | Turner & Hooch | Roger Spottiswoode | |
| 1989 | Worth Winning | Will Mackenzie | |
| 1990 | Love Hurts | Bud Yorkin | |
| 1990 | Ghost | Jerry Zucker | |
| 1990 | Three Men and a Little Lady | Emile Ardolino | |
| 1991 | Terminator 2: Judgment Day | James Cameron | |
| 1992 | Sister Act | Emile Ardolino | |
| 1992 | Toys | Barry Levinson | |
| 1993 | Dave | Ivan Reitman | |
| 1994 | Renaissance Man | Penny Marshall | |
| 1994 | North | Rob Reiner | |
| 1994 | Junior | Ivan Reitman | |
| 1995 | First Knight | Jerry Zucker | |
| 1995 | The Surrogate | Jan Egleson; Raymond Hartung | |
| 1996 | Eraser | Chuck Russell | |
| 1998 | Sphere | Barry Levinson | |
| 1998 | Rush Hour | Brett Ratner | |
| 1999 | Inspector Gadget | David Kellogg | |
| 2002 | Collateral Damage | Andrew Davis | |
| 2002 | The Santa Clause 2 | Michael Lembeck | |
| 2006 | Snakes on a Plane | David R. Ellis | |

=== Television ===
| Year | Title | Director | Notes |
|---|---|---|---|
| 1970–1973 | Lool | Boaz Davidson; Uri Zohar | |
| 1982 | The New Odd Couple | Joel Zwick | 4 episodes |

TV movies

| Year | Title | Director |
|---|---|---|
| 1979 | Mary and Joseph: A Story of Faith | Eric Till |
| 1982 | A Woman Called Golda | Alan Gibson |
| 1982 | Remembrance of Love | Jack Smight |

== Accolades ==
| Year | Award | Nomination | Title | Result |
|---|---|---|---|---|
| 1990 | American Society of Cinematographers | Outstanding Achievement in Cinematography | Ghost | Nominated |
| 1991 | Academy Awards | Best Cinematography | Terminator 2: Judgment Day | Nominated |
| 1991 | American Society of Cinematographers | Outstanding Achievement in Cinematography | Terminator 2: Judgment Day | Nominated |
| 1991 | British Society of Cinematographers | Best Cinematography | Terminator 2: Judgment Day | Nominated |
| 1991 | Dallas–Fort Worth Film Critics Association | Best Cinematography | Terminator 2: Judgment Day | Nominated |
