= CineFest Miskolc International Film Festival =

Annual film festival in Hungary

Miskolc International Film Festival
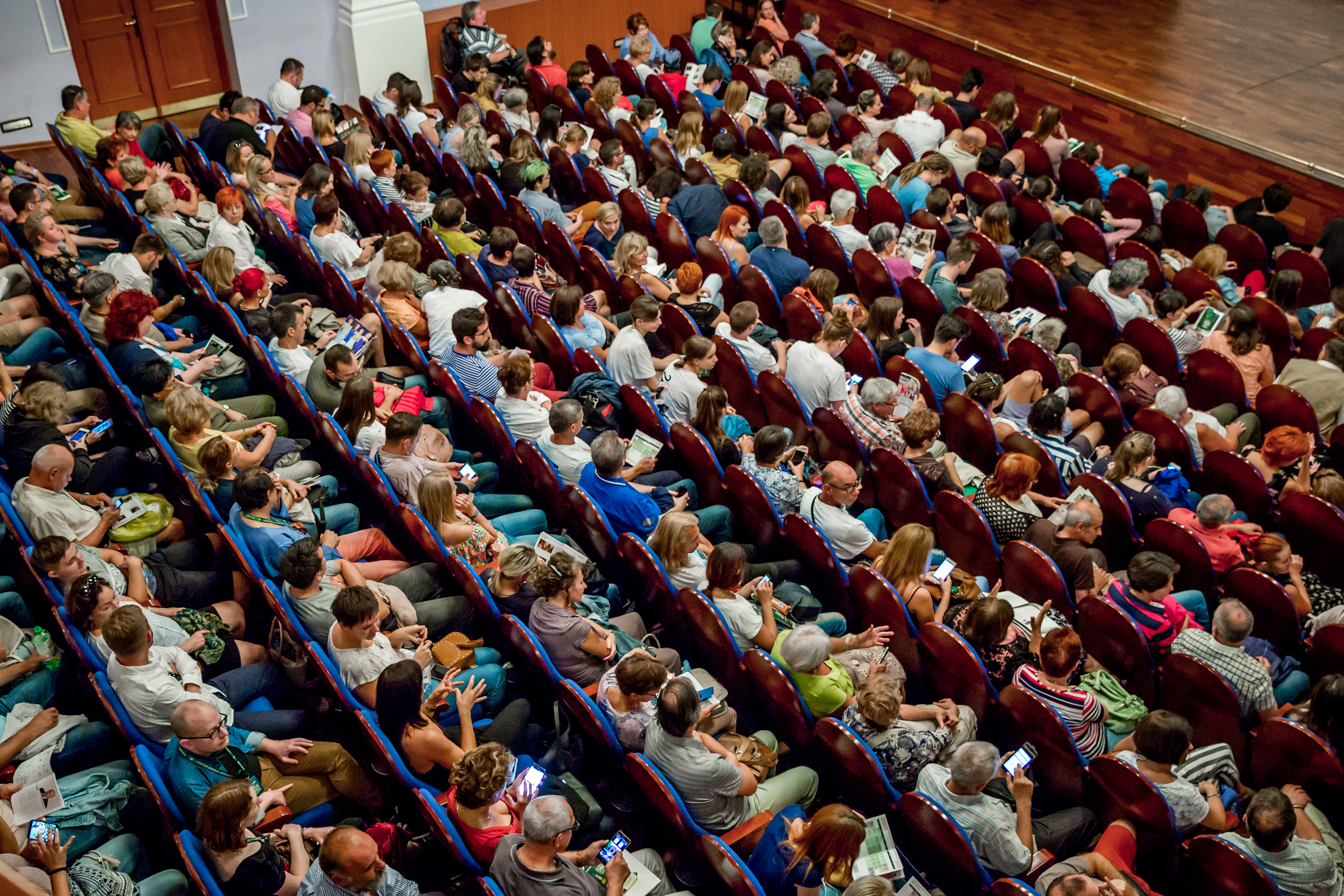
- CineFest opening ceremony, 2018
- Location: Miskolc, Borsod-Abaúj-Zemplén County, Hungary
- Predecessor: Lillafüred National Film Days
- Founded: 2004
- Awards: Europe Awards; Lifetime Awards; European Cinema Ambassador Award; Emeric Pressburger Prize; Adolph Zukor Prize; Attila Dargay Prize
- Festival date: September
- Website: cinefest.hu

The CineFest Miskolc International Film Festival is an annual film festival held in the town of Miskolc, in Hungary. It was founded under the name of Festival of Young Filmmakers in 2004 with a focus on filmmakers under the age of 35. The festival now presents feature films, shorts, documentaries, and animated films. All programs, screenings, conferences, and exhibitions are free to attend.

== History ==
=== Miskolc film tradition ===
The first Hungarian film festival was held in Miskolc in 1938. Using the Venice Film Festival as an inspiration, the rooms of the Palace Hotel hosted numerous Hungarian stars and directors during the Lillafüred National Film Days. For decades since the 1960s, the most important Hungarian documentary and television festivals were also held in Miskolc. In addition to this, Miskolc and its surroundings play a role in the history of Hollywood cinema: William Fox (producer), founder of Fox Film, which went on to become 20th Century Fox, was born in the nearby village of Tolcsva, while Adolph Zukor, founder of Paramount Pictures, was born in Ricse.

=== CineFest ===
The festival was founded in 2004 with the idea of providing young filmmakers a platform to showcase their creations. The event grew with each year, increasing the number of submissions and films screened, and the number of awards grew as well. This was accompanied by film-related programs and workshops, conferences, concerts, and parties.

In 2010, the CineClassics category was established, drawing attention to Hungarian filmmakers with global renown but little prominence in their home country, such as William Fox and Adolph Zukor. The first to be featured was Emeric Pressburger, the Oscar-winning British screenwriter-director, born in Miskolc, and best known for his film collaboration with Michael Powell in the multiple award-winning partnership known as The Archers. Since 2010, the Emeric Pressburger Prize has been the highest honour conferred by the festival.

Since 2017, thanks to the festival's partnership agreement with the Shanghai International Film Festival, works of Chinese cinema have been screened at Miskolc. Also in 2017, the festival organized the first Central European TorinoFilmLab, which is dedicated to the script development process, and helps creative teams working on their first or second feature films in project development and attention-grabbing devices.

In 2019, FIPRESCI held its general assembly at CineFest. The festival's jury is made up of members of FIPRESCI, CICAE, as well as various other international film associations.

== Awards ==
- Imre Pressburger Prize
- Zukor Adolf Award
- Special jury prize
- Best short film
- International Ecumenical Jury Prize
- Dargay Attila Prize
- CineNewWave category award
- CICAE Jury Award
- FIPRESCI Jury Award
- Audience Award
- Lifetime Achievement Award
- European Cinema Ambassador Award
- Cinematography Award

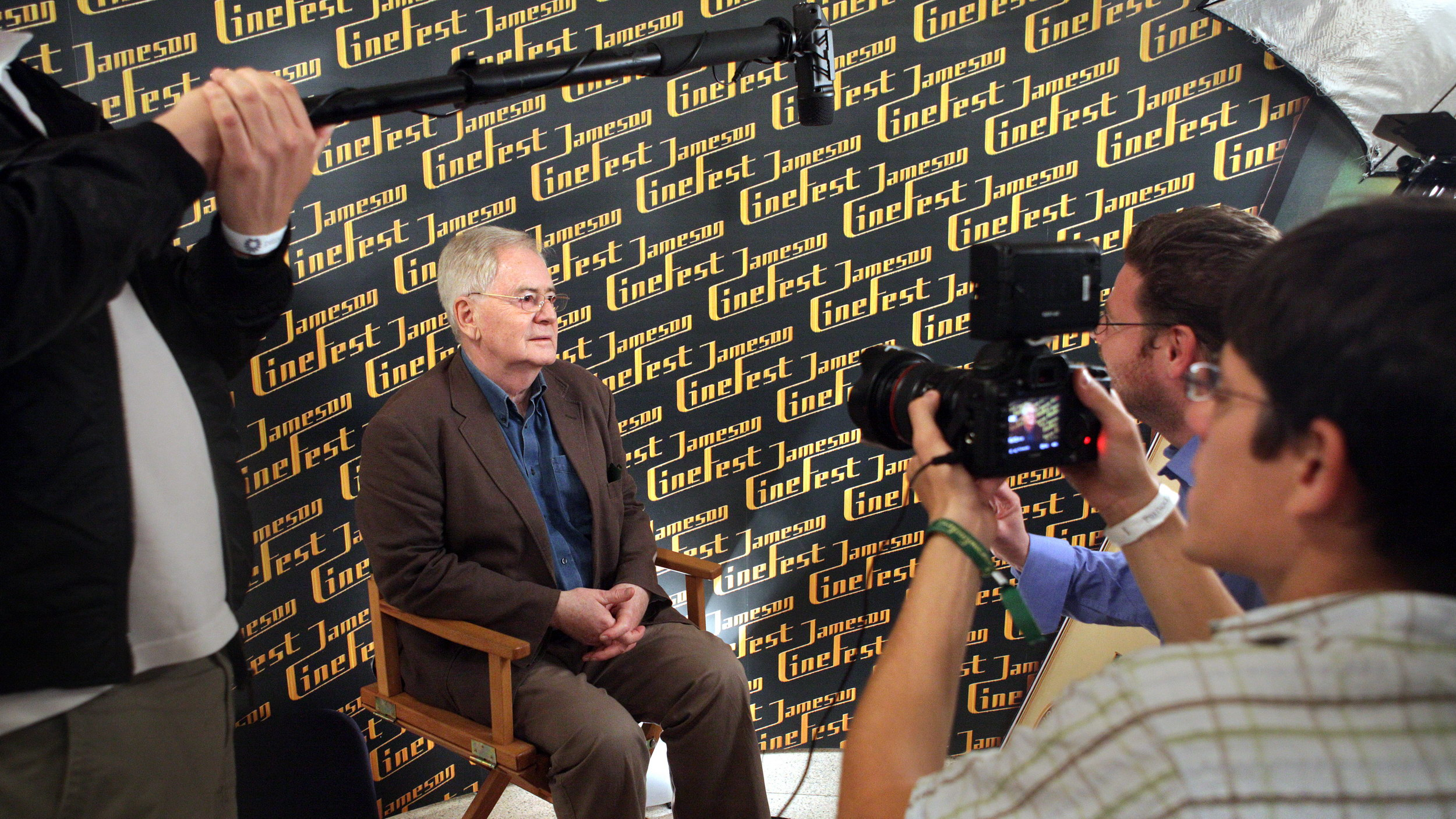
Szabó István at CineFest

=== Lifetime Achievement Awards ===
- 2021: Marcell Jankovics
- 2019: Bille August
- 2018: István Hildebrand
- 2017: Jiří Menzel
- 2016: Károly Makk
- 2015: Claudia Cardinale
- 2014: Vilmos Zsigmond
- 2013: István Szabó
- 2012: Agnieszka Holland
- 2010: Miklós Jancsó
- 2009: Slawomir Idziak
- 2008: Lívia Gyarmathy

== Emeric Pressburger Prize ==
Film title	Director	Year Of Production	Ref
Wheel of Fortune and Fantasy	Ryûsuke Hamaguchi	2021	
Monos	Alejandro Landes	2019	
The Guilty	Gustav Möller	2018	
Western	Valeska Grisebach	2017	
From Nowhere	Matthew Newton	2016	
Mustang	Deniz Gamze Ergüven	2015	
Class Enemy	Rok Biček	2014	
Nothing Bad Can Happen	Katrin Gebbe	2013	
Vanishing Waves	Kristina Buožytė	2012	
Breathing	Karl Markovics	2011	
Women Without Men	Shirin Neshat, Shoja Azari	2010	
Thomas	Miika Soini	2009	
In Transit (En Transito)	Isabel Muñoz	2008	
A Tooth for an Eye (Diente por ojo)	Elvind Holmboe-Salmón	2007	
Oskar	Guro Ekornholmen	2006	
The Bridge	Ilena Stanculescu	2005	
Indecision	Charles Barker	2004	
The Last Day (Der Letzte Tag)	Thorsten Trimpop	2004	

== Reviews ==
- László Kolozsi of Revizor Online wrote in 2010 that "CineFest needed less than ten years to grow into becoming the most important Hungarian film festival with the best official selection"
- László Valuska stated in 2011 that "Miskolc is no less than being the Cannes of the Hungarian man"
- In 2018, Zoltán Huber stated that "...the CineFest in Miskolc...is worth visiting at least once, even if you are not at all excited about watching promising movies a few days or weeks before their show. The “CineFest experience” is always more than what the program has to offer..."
