= Benita Raphan =

American filmmaker and designer (1962–2021)

- Born: November 5, 1962; New York City, New York, U.S.
- Died: January 10, 2021 (aged 58); New York City, New York, U.S.
- Education: School of Visual Arts (BFA); Royal College of Art (MFA)
- Occupations: Filmmaker; Designer
- Employer: School of Visual Arts
- Known for: Short experimental documentary films
- Awards: MacDowell Fellowship (2004); Guggenheim Fellowship (2019)

Benita Raphan (November 5, 1962, New York City – January 10, 2021, New York City) was an American filmmaker and designer. She was known for directing short documentary films about "eccentric and unusual minds", including John Nash, Buckminster Fuller, Edwin Land and Emily Dickinson.

Raphan received her undergraduate degree from the School of Visual Arts in New York City and her Master of Fine Arts degree from the Royal College of Art in London. She spent 10 years in Paris as a graphic designer for various fashion companies and came back to New York in mid-1990s. She taught at the School of Visual Arts for the last 15 years of her life.

She received a MacDowell Fellowship in 2004. Her films have been bought for the collections of the British Film & Video Artists' Film Study Collection and the Walker Art Center, and her design collages are in the permanent collection of the Cooper Hewitt National Design Museum. She was awarded a 2019 Guggenheim fellowship.
