= Boaz Frankel =

American television personality

- Born: 24 May 1982 (age 44); Portland, Oregon, U.S.
- Education: Woodrow Wilson High School; New York University
- Occupations: TV personality Documentary maker
- Years active: 2001-present
- Known for: The Kazoo Museum
- Television: On the Cusp; Clips & Quips; The Un-Road Trip

Boaz Frankel (born May 24, 1982) is an American television personality who hosted and co-created the television show Clips & Quips and created the video series The Un-Road Trip, slated to become a television series on Halogen TV in 2011.

He is also the curator of The Kazoo Museum in Beaufort, South Carolina and owner of one of the largest collections of kazoos in the world.

== Early life and education ==
Frankel was born and raised Portland, Oregon, to Jewish family. He attended the Portland Jewish Academy and graduated from Wilson High School in 2000. He attended New York University's Tisch School of the Arts, graduating in 2004 with a degree in dramatic writing.

== Career ==
=== College television ===
While studying at NYU Frankel co-created a late-night talk show, On The Cusp, that became the most popular program to ever air on NYU TV. In 2004, in his final year at Tisch, Boaz appeared on the Today Show's "The Intern" segment where he went on to win the top prize. Also during his senior year he became an intern on Last Call with Carson Daly. It was during his internship that Frankel heard about auditions for the WB reality show, Studio 7, in which he appeared on one episode in August 2004.

After graduating from NYU in 2004, Frankel created and hosted Clips & Quips, an offbeat entertainment talk show that aired online and on college television stations nationwide for three years. He arranged the first kazoo-sponsored TV show and taught Peter Sarsgaard to play kazoo and Sarah Silverman to play dreidel. Amongst other celebrities who appeared on the show, Frankel has interviewed Natalie Portman, Pierce Brosnan, Dame Judi Dench and Will Ferrell. In June 2007, Boaz brought Clips & Quips to an end and began development of Backstage Live, a new online entertainment talk show for Social Strata.

=== The Un-Road Trip ===
In April 2009 Frankel started a project called the Un-Road Trip in which he travelled across North America for 10 weeks using any mode of transportation except for the gas powered car and documented his progress on video, Twitter, blogs and in photos. The trip began in Portland, Oregon, from where he travelled across the United States and to parts of Canada, returning to Portland at the end of the journey. Frankel's goal was to find alternative modes of transport and during the trip the modes of transport he used include: a duffy boat, a paddle boat, Harley-Davidson motorcycle, train, electric bicycle kayak, paraglider, Couchbike, Treadmill Bike , Segway and camel. Coverage of the trip by the media included NBC's Today Show and CBC Television's The National.

As of August 2010 the Un-Road Trip is being developed as a 10 episode television series for Halogen TV who have licensed the footage Frankel produced during the trip and given him a contract to produce, co-write and host the series.

=== The Pedal-Powered Talk Show ===
In 2012, Frankel started the "Pedal-Powered Talk Show", a show where Frankel interviews people in a desk attached to the front of a bicycle. The show is set in Portland, Oregon.

=== Pittsburgh Today Live & Talk Pittsburgh ===
In 2023 Frankel Joined KDKA-TV as a reporter for Pittsburgh Today Live (PTL) a daytime talk show in Pittsburgh and Talk Pittsburgh a Talk Show that airs between CBS's The Talk and KDKA-TV News at Four. Frankel has also filled in as a Host for both shows a few times.

=== Other work ===
In fall 2009 Frankel took a freelance job with the Smithsonian Institution in Washington, D.C. producing videos describing some of the eccentric mail delivery methods used by the U.S. Postal Service. He became the U.S. project manager for the Earth Day celebration in 2010, responsible for various aspects of event organization from producing videos to writing educational materials for schools. Frankel has carried out freelance reporting assignments for Current TV.

== The Kazoo Museum ==
Frankel is the owner and curator of The Kazoo Museum, which was the only kazoo museum on the West Coast when it opened in Seattle in 2007. The museum has since been relocated to Beaufort, SC where it officially opened in its new location in October 2010.
