= Open Socrates =

2025 book by Agnes Callard

- Author: Agnes Callard
- Subject: Philosophy
- Publisher: W. W. Norton
- Publication date: January 14, 2025
- Pages: 416
- ISBN: 978-1-63149-846-6

Open Socrates is a 2025 book by American philosopher Agnes Callard.

== Summary ==
The book is divided into three parts: "Untimely Questions" (chapters 1–4), "The Socratic Method" (chapters 5–7), and "Socratic Answers" (chapters 8–11)

=== Part 1: Untimely Questions ===
Chapter 1: "The Tolstoy Problem"

Chapter 2: "Load-Bearing Answers"

Chapter 3: "Savage Commands"

Chapter 4: "Socratic Intellectualism"

=== Part 2: The Socratic Method ===
Chapter 5: "The Gadfly-Midwife Paradox"

Chapter 6: "Moore's Paradox of Self-Knowledge"

Chapter 7: "Meno's Paradox"

=== Part 3: Socratic Answers ===
Chapter 8: "Politics: Justice and Liberty"

Chapter 9: "Politics: Equality"

Chapter 10: "Love"

Chapter 11: "Death"

== Bibliography ==
- Bailey, Pippa (January 25, 2025). "Agnes Callard: 'Socrates wants us to reflect on the oddity of our sexual practices'". New Statesman.
- Clare, Tim (January 16, 2025). "Open Socrates by Agnes Callard review – a design for life". The Guardian. ISSN 0261-3077.
- Demillo, Andrew (January 13, 2025). "Book Review: 'Open Socrates' shows why philosophy isn't a spectator sport". AP News.
- Power, Nina (January 4, 2025). "Why Socrates was right about free speech". The Daily Telegraph. ISSN 0307-1235.
- Rothman, Joshua (January 21, 2025). "Should You Question Everything?". The New Yorker. ISSN 0028-792X.
- Szalai, Jennifer (January 15, 2025). "The Secret to a Good Life? Thinking Like Socrates". The New York Times. ISSN 0362-4331.
