= Agnes Callard =

Hungarian-American philosopher (born 1976)

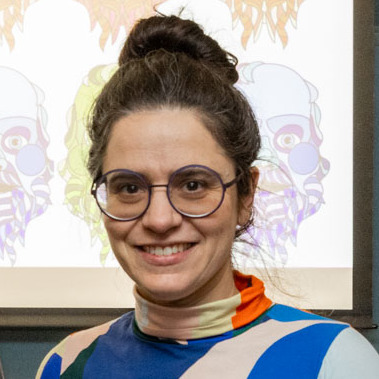
- Born: Agnes Gellen; January 6, 1976 (age 50); Budapest, Hungarian People's Republic
- Other name: Agnes Gellen Callard
- Spouses: Ben Callard (m. 2003; div. 2011): Arnold Brooks (m. c. 2012)

Education
- Education: University of Chicago (BA, 1997); University of California, Berkeley (MA, 2000; PhD, 2008)
- Thesis: An Incomparabilist Account of Akrasia (2008)
- Doctoral advisor: Samuel Scheffler

Philosophical work
- Era: Contemporary philosophy
- Region: Western philosophy
- School: Analytic philosophy
- Institutions: University of Chicago
- Main interests: Ancient philosophy; Ethics; Moral psychology
- Notable ideas: Theory of aspiration; Proleptic reasons

Agnes Callard (née Gellen; born 1976) is a Hungarian-American philosopher and an associate professor of philosophy at the University of Chicago. Her primary areas of specialization are ancient philosophy and ethics. She is also noted for her popular writings and work on public philosophy.

== Early life and education ==
Callard was born on January 6, 1976, in Budapest, Hungary, to a Jewish family. Her mother, Judit Gellen, was a hematologist and oncologist in the 1980s, specializing in the treatment of AIDS; she also worked as a prison doctor at Riker's Island. Callard's father studied law in Hungary but became a carpet salesman in the US and retired as a steel exporter. Both sets of grandparents were Holocaust survivors. Callard was raised in Budapest until age five. She and her parents later moved to Rome before settling in the New York metropolitan area. She has a sister.

She earned a Bachelor of Arts degree from the University of Chicago, majoring in Fundamentals. She subsequently earned a Master of Arts degree in classics from the University of California, Berkeley, leaving that doctoral program without a dissertation, then studied philosophy at Princeton University before returning to Berkeley and completing her PhD in philosophy.

== Career ==
=== Academia ===
Callard has been a faculty member at the University of Chicago since 2008, becoming an associate professor of philosophy in 2017.

With L. A. Paul, Callard received the 2020 Lebowitz Prize, awarded by the American Philosophical Association and Phi Beta Kappa. She received a Guggenheim Fellowship in 2019. In 2017, she received the Quantrell Award.

=== Public writing and speaking ===
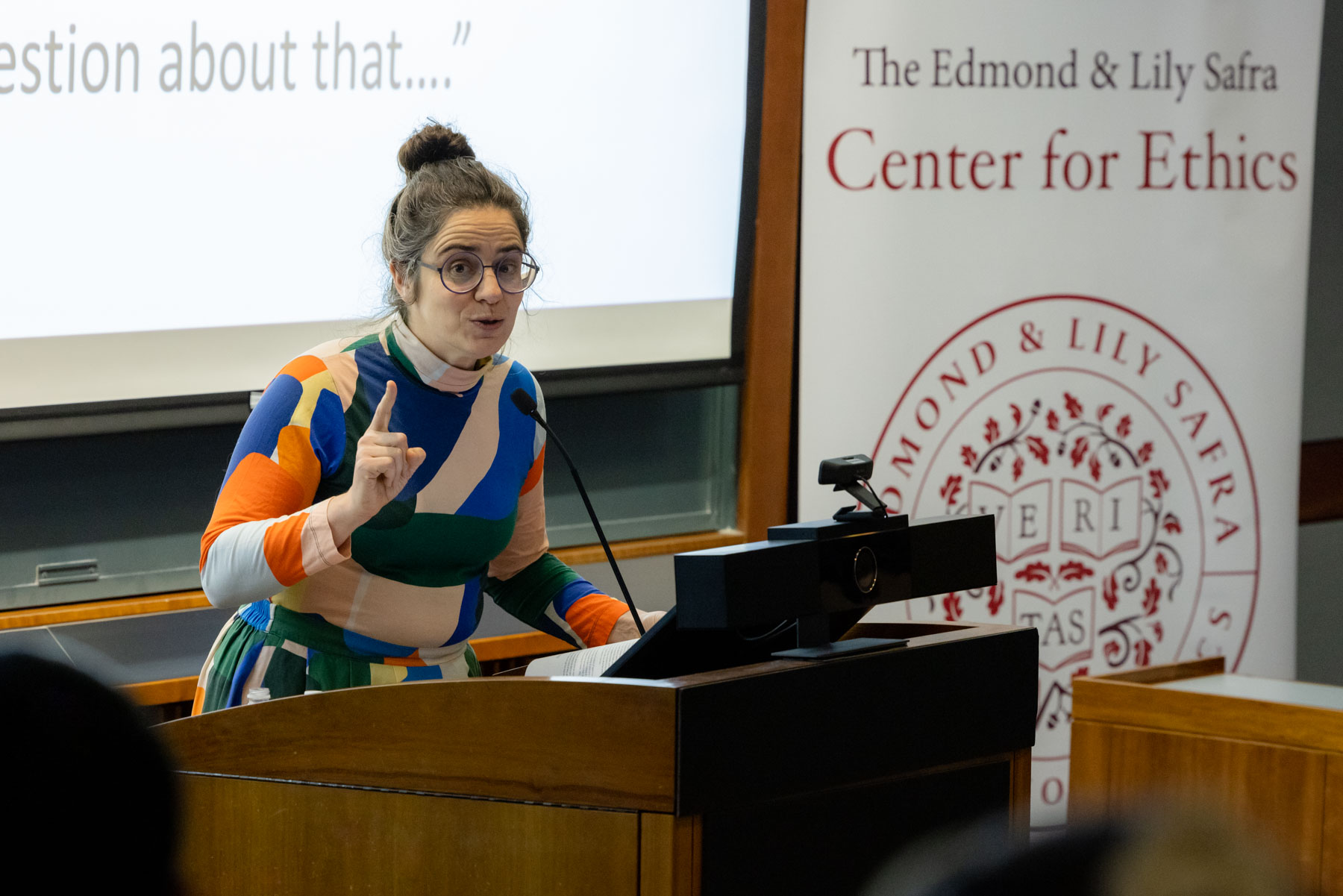
Callard delivering the Mala and Solomon Kamm Lecture in Ethics in 2023

Callard has published in the Boston Review, The New Yorker, and The New York Times, and has written a column on public philosophy for The Point magazine. Podcasts that have hosted her include EconTalk, the Elucidations Podcast, and The Ezra Klein Show.

In 2017, she created the Night Owls public debate series in Hyde Park, Chicago, featuring guests such as Tyler Cowen, Chris Blattman, Ezra Klein, and Hollis Robbins, and in November 2018 participated in one with her ex-husband and colleague Ben Callard, on the philosophy of divorce.

She hosts the podcast Minds Almost Meeting together with the economist Robin Hanson.

== Theory on aspiration ==
Agnes Callard's longest book is Aspiration: The Agency of Becoming, which outlines and defends a theory about the process of changes in an individual's values, which she calls "aspiration". A summary of the book which was made by a fan and endorsed by the author divides the book into these core claims and various supporting claims (not reproduced here):

1. Aspiration is the form of agency directed at the acquisition of values. It is different from ambition, which is the pursuit of external rewards like money or social status, rather than seeking to acquire new values.
2. Aspiration is a unique kind of rational agency, and requires a unique theoretical approach; it cannot be understood in terms of decision theory.
3. "Proleptic reasons" are practical reasons unique to aspirants. These reasons are directed at generating wants, rather than satisfying them.
4. A specific form of psychological conflict called "intrinsic conflict" is unique to aspiration. Aspirants feel torn between their current values and the values they aim to acquire, which makes coming to love or appreciate something difficult.
5. Akrasia is an instance of intrinsic conflict. Akrasia results from the imperfect grasp of values and the need to make decisions based on our current understanding.
6. Aspiration must be framed as a process in which we are guided by the values of the self which we aspire to be, rather than our current values. This framing avoids a dilemma where, as Abbé Sieyès might have put it, "if the new values agree with the old, the change is superfluous; if they disagree, the change cannot come from our rational agency."
7. Individuals are praiseworthy for the good valuational condition they attain through aspiration, while they are blameworthy for the culpable failure to aspire to a better condition.
8. The theory of aspiration helps us understand situations of motherhood and infertility, for example, better than other theories that have so far been invented.

Each numbered claim is supposed to be made by the corresponding numbered chapter in the book, with claim 0 made in the introduction section and claim 7 in the conclusion section. The reference to Abbé Sieyès refers to the quote on bicameralism attributed to him: "if a second chamber dissents from the first, it is mischievous; if it agrees it is superfluous." The reference to Sieyès was not made in Callard's book itself, but was made by the summary as a way to explain what the book refers to as "Strawson's Dilemma" (after Galen Strawson, who proposed it).

Note that "decision theory" in the book's context refers to a number of philosophical theories about decisions, not to the branch of probability known as decision theory.

== Personal life ==
In 2011, Callard divorced her husband, fellow University of Chicago professor Ben Callard, whom she had married in 2003. She began a relationship with Arnold Brooks, who was a graduate student at the time. After a year of dating, they married. Agnes has two children with Callard and one with Brooks. She lives in a home with both her current and ex-husband.

Callard was diagnosed with autism in her 30s.

== Bibliography ==
=== Books ===
- Callard, Agnes (2018). Aspiration: The Agency of Becoming. Vol. 1. Oxford University Press. doi:10.1093/oso/9780190639488.001.0001. ISBN 978-0-19-063951-8. (Note: Reviews of Aspiration: Martin, Adrienne M. (September 2019). "Review of Aspiration". European Journal of Philosophy. 27 (3): 814–817. doi:10.1111/ejop.12477. ISSN 0966-8373. S2CID 211941343.; Hartman, Robert J. (April 2019). "Review of Aspiration". The Philosophical Quarterly. 69 (275): 427–429. doi:10.1093/pq/pqy039. ISSN 0031-8094.; Rothman, Joshua (January 14, 2019). "The Art of Decision-Making". The New Yorker. Archived from the original on July 1, 2020.)
- —, ed. (2020). On Anger. MIT Press. ISBN 978-1-946511-56-0. On Anger was selected as one of The New Yorker's "Best Books We Read in 2020".
- Question Everything: A Stone Reader. Peter Catapano, Simon Critchley (2022). Liveright, New York. ISBN 978-1-324-09183-7.
- Open Socrates (2025) ISBN 978-1-63149-846-6

=== The New Yorker columns ===
- Callard, Agnes (June 24, 2023). "The case against travel". The Weekend Essay. The New Yorker. (Note: Available on website only.)

Bibliography notes
