= Noa Steimatsky =

American film historian

- Occupation: Film Historian
- Awards: Guggenheim Fellowship (2019), National Endowment for the Humanities Fellowship (2019), American Council of Learned Societies Fellowship (2017), American Academy in Rome NEH Postdoctoral Fellowship (2005), Getty Research Grant (2000)

Academic work
- Discipline: Film studies
- Sub-discipline: Cinema of Italy, Film Theory
- Institutions: Yale University; University of Chicago

Noa Steimatsky is an American film academic. She graduated from the Hebrew University of Jerusalem with a BA in English Literature, and moved to the United States, where she got her PhD at the New York University. She was a faculty member at Yale University and University of Chicago, and has received awards and fellowships for her scholarship in the cinema of Italy, including a 2019 Guggenheim Fellowship. She wrote the books Italian Locations: Reinhabiting the Past in Postwar Cinema (2008) and The Face on Film (2017).

== Biography ==
Noa Steimatsky was born in Paris, daughter of painter Avigdor Stematsky and microbiologist Tamar Gotlieb-Steimatsky. She worked as a post-production assistant to David Perlov on his 1983 film Diary. She studied at the Hebrew University of Jerusalem (where she got her BA in English Literature in 1984) and subsequently moved to the US, to study at New York University (NYU) (where she got her MA in English Literature in 1986 and a PhD in Cinema Studies at Tisch School of the Arts in 1995); Her mentor was Annette Michelson, while her dissertation, The Earth Figured: an Exploration of Landscape in the Italian Cinema (1995), was supervised by Richard Allen.

After working as an adjunct professor at the Tisch School of the Arts, School of Visual Arts and Vassar Collage, she moved to Yale University Department of the History of Art as a visiting assistant professor in 1997, and was promoted to assistant professor in 1998 and associate professor in 2005. In collaboration with the European Studies Council at Yale University, she was the initiator of the ongoing yearly festival featuring a historical year in cinema. In 2008 she was hired by the Department of Cinema and Media Studies at the University of Chicago, also serving as Director of Graduate Studies, remaining an associate professor there until 2015. Family circumstances, relating to her husband Paolo Barlera's diplomatic career (most recently as vice-consul/director of the Italian Cultural Institute in Sydney) prompted her departure from a fixed academic position. She served as a visiting professor at Stanford University, the University of California, Berkeley, Sarah Lawrence College.

As an academic, she specializes in film studies: her scholarship spans two primary areas, one focused on Italian film history, and the other on the cinematic face as part of the study of film aesthetics and poetics. In 2008, she published the book Italian Locations: Reinhabiting the Past in Postwar Cinema. In 2017, she published The Face on Film with Oxford University Press, an abundantly illustrated book on the role of the human face in film history and theory; This book won the 2018 Limina Award for Best International Film Studies Book, and an Honorable Mention from the Society for Cinema and Media Studies Katherine Singer Kovács Book Award.

In 2005, she was an American Academy in Rome Fellow in Modern Italian Studies, during which time she launched her groundbreaking research project on the Cinecittà movie studio as a displaced-persons camp in the postwar era. She lectured on this topic internationally, her essays on the topic were published in both English and Italian. The project inspired a documentary film, Refugees in Cinecittà / Profughi a Cinecittà (dir. Marco Bertozzi, 2012) . When leaving her full-time academic post, she returned to further research on the topic, driven by more discoveries about Cinecittà’s numerous uses and misuses throughout the 1940s . For this project she was awarded an American Council of Learned Societies Fellowship in 2017 , a National Endowment for the Humanities Fellowship in 2019 , and a Guggenheim Fellowship in 2019 . Her forthcoming book, Cinecittà at War: The Hidden History of a Great Italian Movie Studio is under contract with Columbia University Press . Steimatsky has published numerous articles, some translated to Italian, French, Hebrew, Portuguese, and Chinese. Her recent essays and lectures intertwine questions of history and poetics.

Steimatsky lives between New York City and Rome .

== Filmography ==
Year	Title	Note	Ref.
1983	Diary	Post-production assistant	
2012	Refugees in Cinecitta	Co-writer	

== Works ==
- Italian Locations: Reinhabiting the Past in Postwar Cinema (2008)
- The Face on Film (2017)
