= The Kazoo Museum =

Museum in Beaufort, South Carolina, US

Coordinates: 32.434648°N 80.720168°W

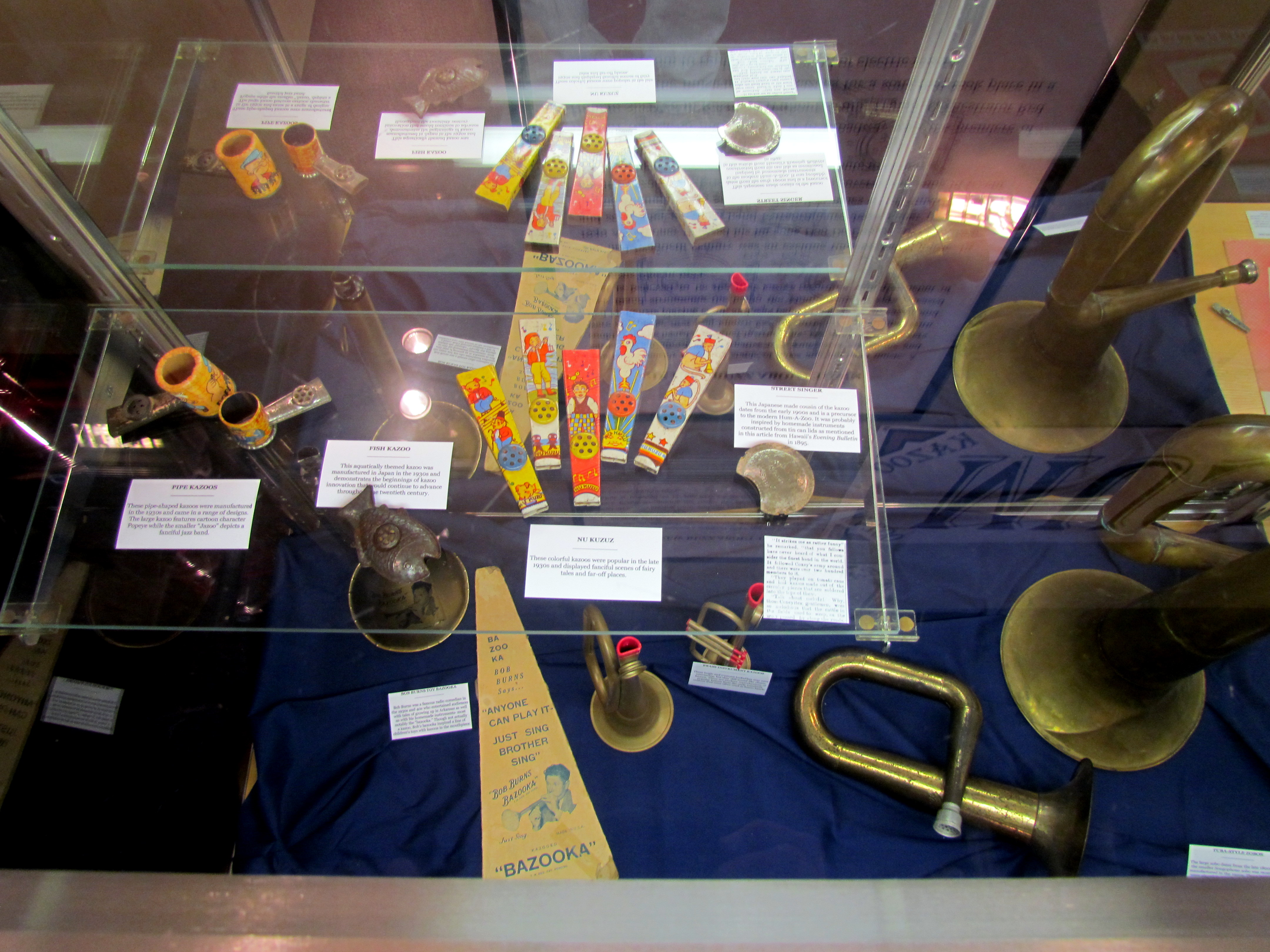
Image from The Kazoo Museum

The Kazoo Museum is a museum dedicated to the history of the kazoo, located in Beaufort, South Carolina. The museum houses one of the largest collections of kazoos in the world. Originally established in 2007 in Seattle, Washington, The Kazoo Museum opened in its current location in Beaufort on October 6, 2010. The museum is located in the Kazoobie Kazoos Factory and features a collection of kazoos, kazoo recordings and kazoo memorabilia.

== History ==
=== Kazoobie Kazoos ===
Kazoobie Kazoos is one of the world’s largest distributors of kazoos, founded by Rick Hubbard and Gayle Andrus in 1997 as an Internet retailer of kazoos. Previously based in Hilton Head Island and in Florida, the company returned to South Carolina in 2009 and settled in co-owner Steven Murray's home town of Beaufort. In this location, Kazoobie expanded into a 6,500 square feet (600 m^{2}) warehouse and showroom and in 2010 added a gift shop and became home to The Kazoo Museum.

=== Museum founding ===
A forerunner of The Kazoo Museum was created by television personality and kazoo enthusiast Boaz Frankel in 2007, located in Seattle. From there the collection moved to Portland, Oregon in 2008, where it was not available for public viewing, except via The Kazoo Museum's website. At this time the collection comprised approximately 100 kazoos, including some of the first kazoos to be manufactured, and various pieces of memorabilia including books, patents, sheet music and records. By 2010 the collection had expanded to around 200 pieces. Upon the invitation of the Kazoobie Kazoos factory, the museum took up residence in Beaufort and officially opened to the public at that location on October 6, 2010.

A ribbon-cutting ceremony was held at Kazoobie Kazoos on the opening day of The Kazoo Museum, attended by local people, curator Boaz Frankel and the owners of Kazoobie Kazoos.

== Collection ==
Museum visitors can learn about the history of the kazoo, from its invention in the 1840s through to the present day at the museum and can tour the working factory to see modern production techniques.

The museum's collection is made up of nearly 200 kazoo-related items, making it one of the world's largest private kazoo collections. All items are kept in glass cases in a dedicated building at the Kazoobie Kazoos factory. Kazoos in the collection include one used in the television program The Partridge Family, kazoos shaped like famous cartoon characters, electric kazoos and kazoos that are over 100 years old. In addition, the museum features an old press used to make kazoo parts, kazoo music sheets and various pieces of memorabilia.

== Gallery ==
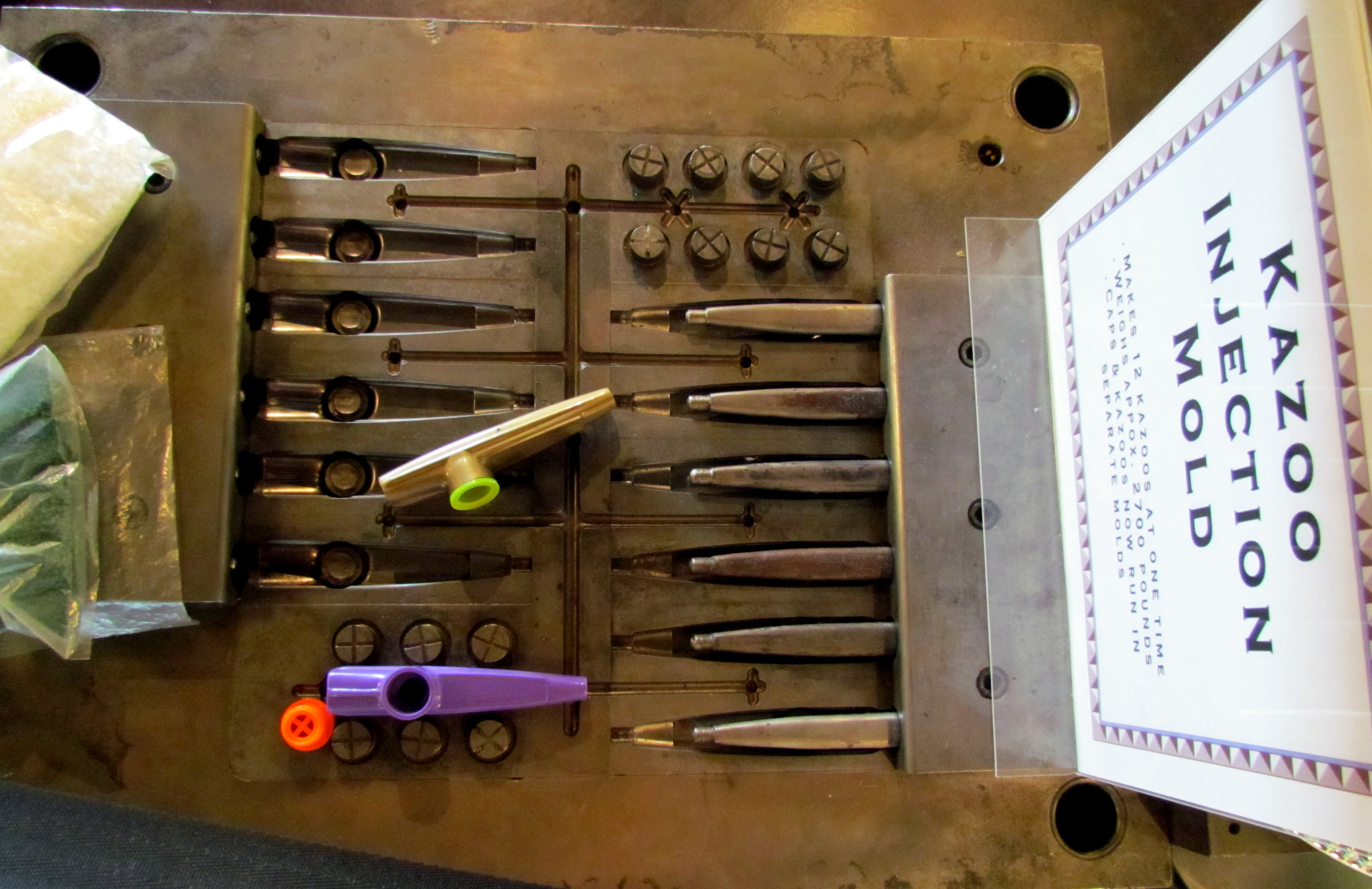

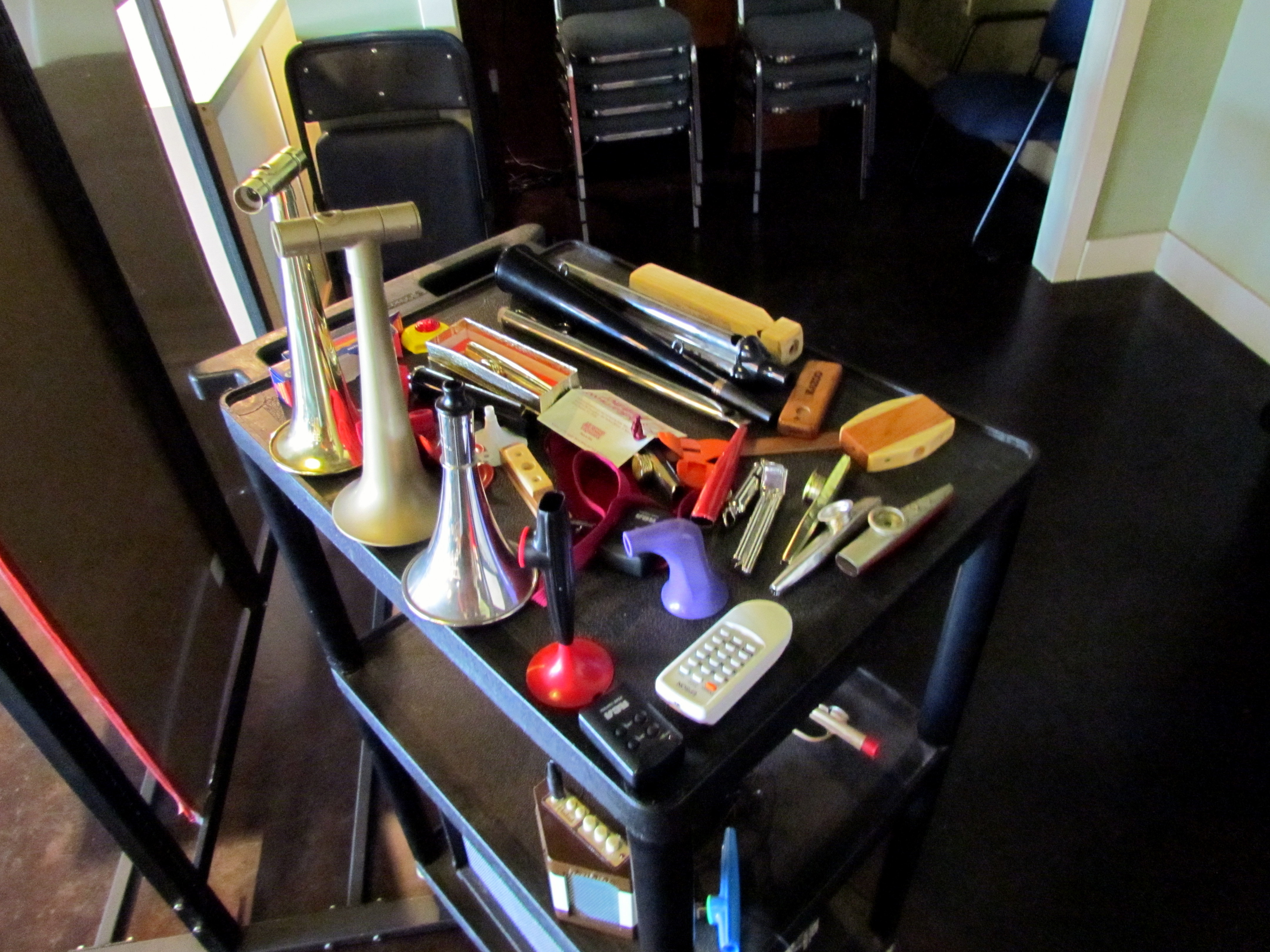

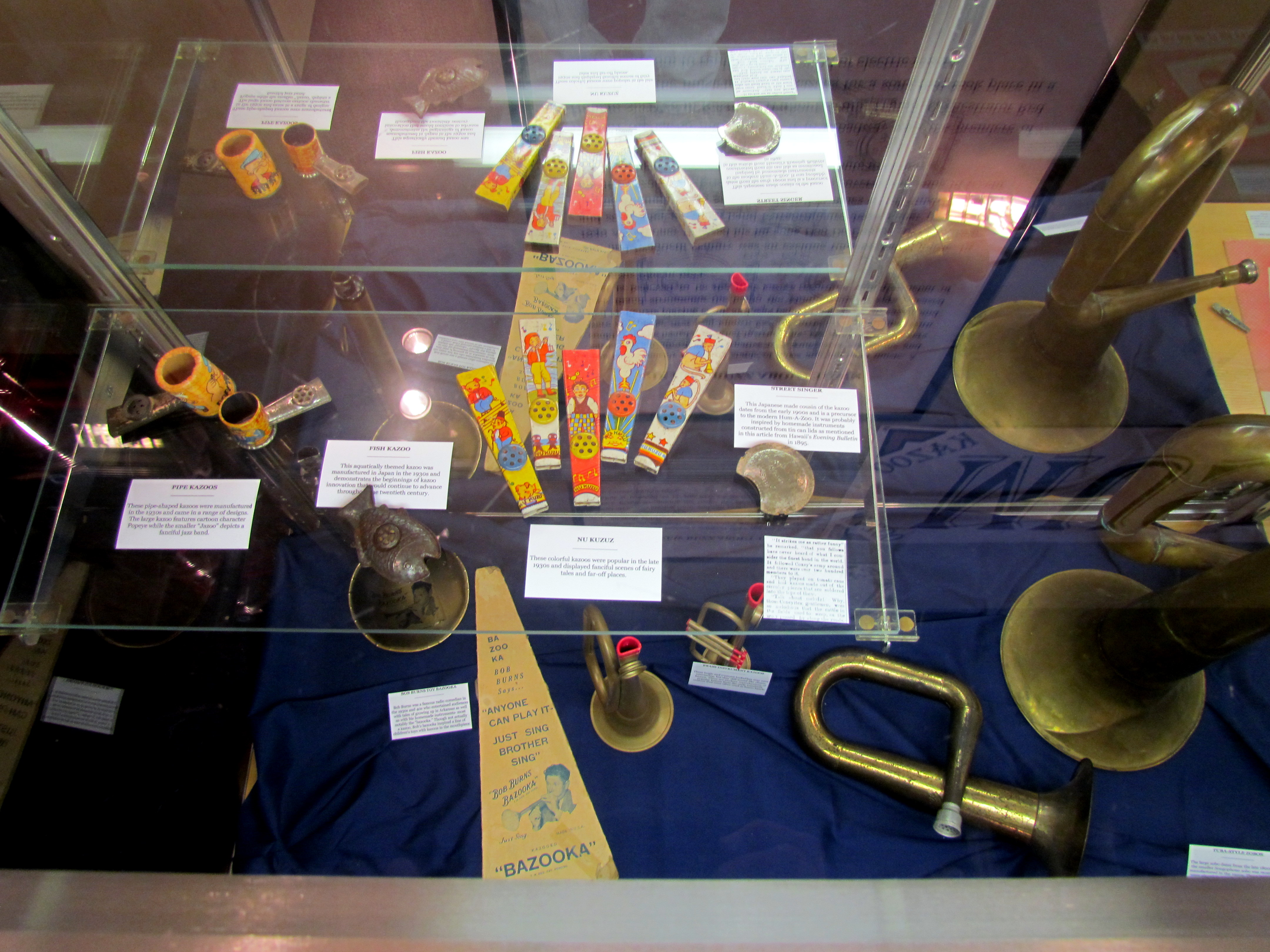

== See also ==
- List of music museums
