= The Point (magazine) =

American literary magazine

- Editor: Jon Baskin, Anastasia Berg, Jesse McCarthy, John Palattella, Becca Rothfeld, Jonny Thakkar, Rachel Wiseman
- Categories: Philosophy, literature, politics
- Frequency: Triannually
- Founder: Jon Baskin, Jonny Thakkar, Etay Zwick
- First issue: 2009
- Country: United States
- Based in: Chicago, IL
- Language: English
- Website: thepointmag.com
- ISSN: 2153-4438

The Point is a thrice-yearly literary magazine established in autumn 2008 by editors Jon Baskin, Jonny Thakkar, and Etay Zwick, then doctoral students at the University of Chicago's Committee on Social Thought. The magazine, based in Chicago, publishes essays in literature, culture, critical theory, politics, and the arts, as well as fiction on occasion; many of its contributors are academics, although it is not an academic journal. The Point was founded as a forum in which ideas of philosophical significance could be discussed “as active forces in our lives and cultures.” It was intended as a remedy to what its editors perceived as shortcomings in the intellectual climate, particularly to the deficit of “seriousness” in the content of popular magazines for an educated audience such as The Atlantic.

Every other issue features a symposium around which a number of essays address a central question. Past symposia have included the questions What is science for? and What are animals for?. The magazine’s editorial perspective strives to bridge scholarly writing and popular accessibility by preserving an attitude of intellectual rigor without abstruseness or academic jargon. The Point, according to its statement of purpose, “is for anybody who is frustrated with the intellectual poverty of the majority of today's journalism and public discourse.”

In the wake of the departure of numerous long-time editors at The New Republic, The Point established a campaign to position itself as a “home for strenuous cultural and literary criticism.”

== Notable contributors ==
- Bill Ayers
- Agnes Callard
- Lorraine Daston
- Raymond Geuss
- Yuval Levin
- Martha Nussbaum
- Robert Pippin
- Steven Poole
- Lucy Sante
- Thomas Chatterton Williams
- Erik Olin Wright
- Slavoj Žižek

== See also ==
- List of literary magazines
- Jacobin (magazine)
- The Baffler
- n+1
- The New Republic
- The New Inquiry
- The Boston Review
- Oxford American
- Guernica
