= Experimental pragmatics =

Use of experiments to investigate pragmatics

Experimental pragmatics is an academic area that uses experiments (concerning children's and adults' comprehension of sentences, utterances, or story-lines) to test theories about the way people understand utterances—and, by extension, one another—in context (this is an area known as pragmatics).

== Technique ==
Given that an utterance generally does not fully determine the message it is destined to convey, the main question this field asks is, how does a listener fully comprehend a speaker's intention? For example, if one were to read about a singer who says "That was a brilliant performance" to her colleague after they both sang beautifully, the utterance would seem sincere and truthful. If the same utterance were made after both sang terribly, the utterance would be perceived as ironic. The very same utterance can have two entirely different interpretations as a function of the speaker's intended meaning.

Experimental pragmatics adopts existing cognitive and psycholinguistic techniques in order to carry out its investigations. While developmental progressions can reveal how interlocutors across several ages interpret utterances with clear pragmatic potential, reading times can reveal how sentences are processed (as relatively easy or difficult). While EEGs can reveal sharp on-line measures for determining how a word is integrated into a sentence, fMRI can reveal what areas of the brain are recruited when processing one reading over another.

Philosophers have laid the groundwork for much of the work in pragmatics. Modern investigations can be traced back to Paul Grice and his philosophical approach to utterance understanding. Grice’s initial contribution was to propose a novel analysis in which he distinguished between sentence meaning (what the words and grammar mean) and speaker’s meaning (what the speaker actually intended to communicate by uttering a sentence). According to Grice, understanding an utterance requires access to, or making hypotheses about, the speaker’s intention and thus involves going beyond the meanings of the words in the sentence.

The experimental turn was the result of an effort to test theories that had until then relied largely on intuition. The most investigated topic in experimental pragmatics is scalar implicature, which concerns the way a weakly expressed utterance (e.g. Some of their identity documents are forgeries) is interpreted. While the linguistic meaning of the utterance is general (Some and perhaps all of their identity documents are forgeries), a listener can conceivably attribute to the speaker a more narrow (and more informative) interpretation (Some but not all of their identity documents are forgeries). While the narrower meaning seems readily accessible to our intuitions, the question is how does it emerge. The earliest experiments pitted an account that assumed that the narrower reading occurs automatically or by default against an account that argued that there are no such defaults, that all interpretations rely on context and that it is perfectly reasonable at times to adopt the more general reading (see Noveck & Reboul, 2008). While scalar implicatures continue to dominate discussion, other prominent topics that fall under the rubric of experimental pragmatics include irony, metaphor, metonymy, reference, and word-learning.

== XPrag conference ==
The growing impact of Experimental Pragmatics can be seen through the increasing number of conferences, workshops, grants, and jobs that have been devoted to it. In one recent announcement (September 2015) for a workshop entitled Trends in Experimental Pragmatics, and organized by the Zentrum für Allgemeine Sprachwissenschaft (ZAS) in Berlin, the organizers wrote: "The field of Experimental Pragmatics was founded by the publication of Noveck & Sperber (2004) who confidently wrote: 'this volume lays down the bases for a new field, Experimental Pragmatics, that draws on pragmatics, psycholinguistics and also on the psychology of reasoning.' The bold prediction has proven remarkably accurate: Experimental Pragmatics has since successfully established itself as an independent field of research, providing a new perspective on age-old pragmatic problems and inspiring new lines of inquiry. In addition to the fields Noveck & Sperber above mentioned, semantics, neuroscience and philosophy have also contributed to Experimental Pragmatics, but also been influenced by it."

The first workshop with the title Experimental Pragmatics took place in Luton, UK in 1998 and was organized by Billy Clark and Steve Nicolle under the auspices of the Linguistics Association of Great Britain (LAGB). The field began to catch on after a workshop in 2001 (organized by Ira Noveck and Dan Sperber in Lyon, France under the auspices of the European Science Foundation). The workshop organizers invited many of the pragmatists and psychologists who consistently relied on, or called for, experimental findings to support or test their pragmatic accounts. Participants in the workshop included Anne Bezuidenhout, Robyn Carston, Gennaro Chierchia, Billy Clark, Herb Clark, Ray Gibbs, Vittorio Girotto, Sam Glucksberg, Rachel Giora, Ira Noveck, Guy Politzer, Anne Reboul, Francois Recanati, Tony Sanford, Dan Sperber, Johan van der Auwera, Jean-Baptiste van der Henst, and Deirdre Wilson. Contributors to the volume (Noveck & Sperber, 2004) were those who pioneered the carrying out of experimental approaches to test pragmatic accounts. Although informal conferences took place after the 2001 workshop, proper biennial conferences on the topic of Experimental Pragmatics have been held since 2005 across Europe. The first conference was held at Cambridge University and was organized by Richard Breheny and Napoleon Katsos. Now known as "XPrag", the conference was held in the United States for the first time in July, 2015. A book entitled "Experimental Pragmatics: The Making of a Cognitive Science", by Ira Noveck, came out in October 2018.

== Research funding ==
Two major European grants have supported the field. The European Science Foundation's (ESF's) Research Network Program (EURO-XPRAG) sponsored European collaborations, workshops and conferences between 2009 and 2014. The German Research Foundation (DFG) established the priority program XPRAG.de in 2014. Other countries that have XPrag programs include Italy (XPrag.it) and Switzerland.
