= David Perlov =

Israeli documentary filmmaker

- דוד פרלוב
- Born: 9 June 1930; Rio de Janeiro, Brazil
- Died: 13 December 2003 (aged 73); Tel Aviv, Israel
- Occupation: Documentary filmmaker
- Spouse: Mira Perlov
- Children: Yael Perlov; Naomi Perlov
- Awards: Israel Prize (1999)

David Perlov (Hebrew: דוד פרלוב; born 9 June 1930 in Rio de Janeiro, Brazil; died 13 December 2003, in Tel Aviv, Israel) was an Israeli documentary filmmaker, photographer and drawer.

== Biography ==
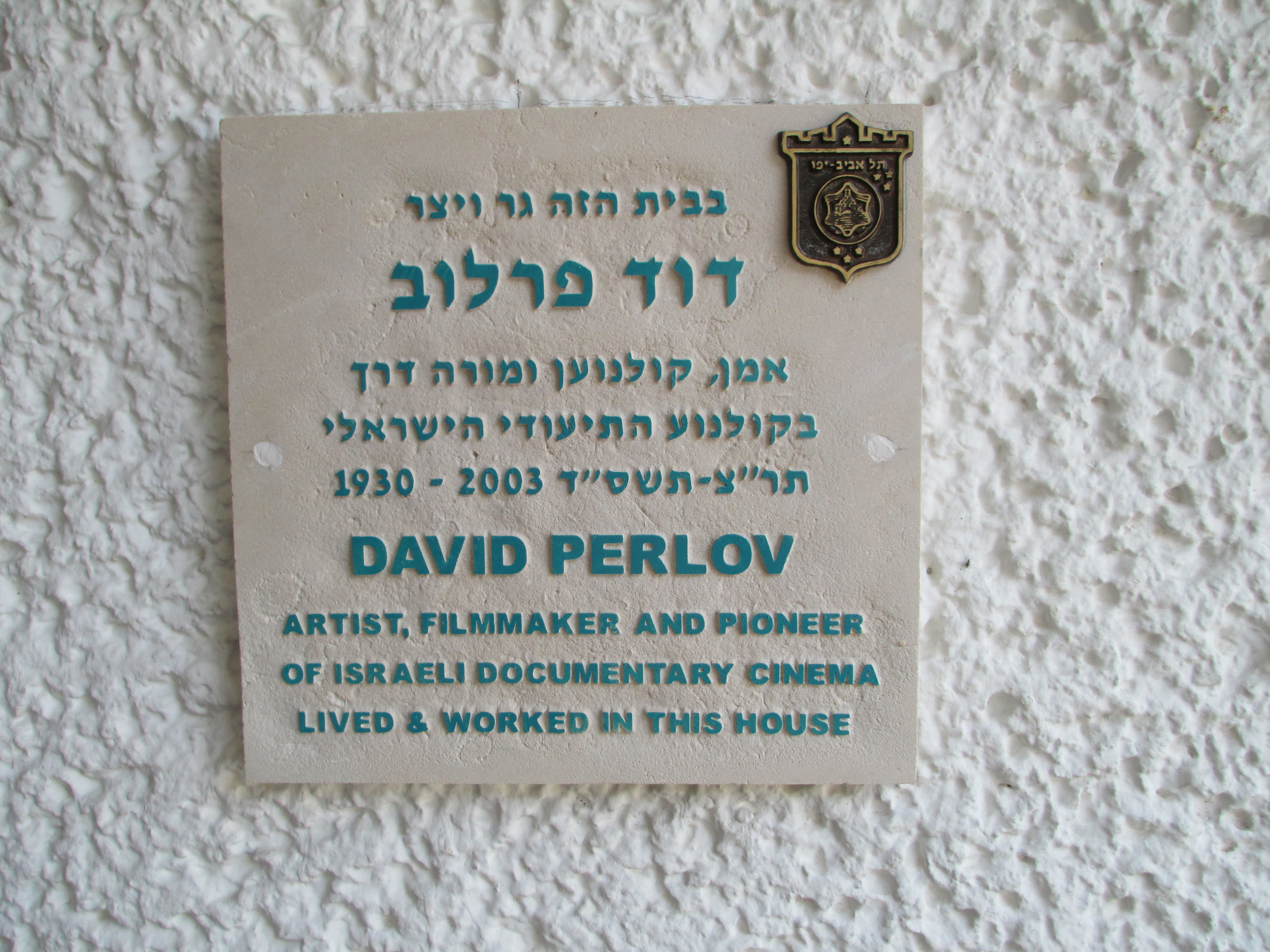
David Perlov, memorial plaque in Tel Aviv

David Perlov was born in Rio de Janeiro and grew up in Belo Horizonte. At the age of 10, he went to live with his grandfather in São Paulo. In the years following the end of World War II Perlov became one of the main leaders of the Zionist Socialist youth movement in Brazil. His artistic vocation, however, led him first to Paris at the age of 22, where he stayed for six years, studying at the Ecole des Beaux Arts and later on at the studio of Arpad Szenes. The prevailing abstract tendencies in the 1950s art world did not satisfy Perlov, and his need to confront more human subjects drew him to stills photography and eventually to cinema. In Paris, he worked as a projectionist for the newly established Cinematheque and worked as editor with the documentary filmmaker Joris Ivens. In 1957, he made his first short film, Tante chinoise (Old Aunt China), based on drawings of a 12-year-old girl of the French provincial bourgeoisie of 1890 which he found in the cellar of the Paris house in which he was living. In 1958, Perlov immigrated to Israel, settling with his wife Mira on Kibbutz Bror Hayil. The couple had two daughters, the twins Yael Perlov and Naomi Perlov. In 1961, they left the kibbutz for Tel Aviv.

== Film career ==
Perlov began directing documentary films for the local authorities, yet throughout the 1960s he encountered time and again the ideological arbitrariness of the Israeli establishment. Based on patriotic propaganda, social realism and a collective rather than individual outlook on reality, this establishment was the only funding source for documentary filmmaking at the time. Still, Perlov took advantage of every work opportunity he had to introduce his own cinematic conception.

In 1963, Perlov made a 33-minute documentary In Jerusalem (בירושלים, Be-Yerushalayim). This film came to be one of the most important films of Israeli documentary cinema. Although Perlov made two feature films by 1972 (The Pill and 42:6), his film proposals were repeatedly rejected by the Israel Broadcasting Authority and Israeli film board, which found his work too lyrical. In 1973, he decided to "start from the beginning," as he himself put it. In May of that year, Perlov bought a 16 mm camera and filmed his everyday life alongside dramatic events that took place in Israel at the time. He continued this work for 10 years, sometimes with almost no economic resources, until Channel 4 of British television expressed an interest in the project in 1983. Produced in association with Israel's largest television and film studio, Herzliya Studios (Ulpanei Herzliya), the result was Perlov's work Diary (יומן).

In 1973, Perlov was among the founders of the new Film and Television department at the Tel Aviv University. From then on, teaching became a crucial part of his artistic and personal development. Perlov also joined the teaching staff of the Sam Spiegel Film School in Jerusalem. In 1987 Perlov was appointed associate professor, and 10 years later full professor at the Film and Television Department of Tel Aviv University.

In 1998, he began work on the Revised Diary. The three one-hour films - "Sheltered Childhood", "Day to Day and Rituals", and "Back to Brasil", center on specific topics, unlike the river-like flow of the earlier Diary.

Already in Paris in 1953, Perlov started taking still photographs. In the last few years of his life he began to devote himself almost entirely to photography, turning to color photographs that were shown in three individual exhibitions. His last film, My Stills released in 2003, was entirely based on the photographs he took over a period of fifty years. That same year, he completed the editing of Anemones a film he produced with his university students.

== Filmography ==
1957 - Old Aunt China, 12 min., 16 mm., film based on drawings

1959 - Shoemakers' Alley in Jaffa, documentary, 12 min., 35 mm., b&w.

1960 - Fishermen in Jaffa, documentary, 11 min., 35 mm., b&w.

1962 - In Thy Blood Live, documentary, 17 min., 35 mm., b&w.

1963 - In Jerusalem, documentary, 33 min., 35 mm., color.

1964 - Tel Katzir, documentary, 33 min., 35 mm., b&w.

1967 - Theater in Israel, documentary, 26 min., 35 mm., color.

1967 - The Pill, fiction, 90 min., 35 mm., b&w and color.

1969 - 42:6, 90 min., 35 mm., color.

1970 - Navy, documentary, 11 min., 35 mm., color.

1973 - Diary, documentary, 6 chapters - 330 min. total, 16 mm., b&w and color.

1977 - Biba, documentary, 50 min., 16 mm., color.

1979 - Memories of the Eichmann Trial, documentary, 60 min., 16 mm., b&w.

1981 - In Search of Ladino, documentary, 60 min., 16 mm., color.

1993 - Tel Katzir 93', documentary, 56 min., Video, color.

1994 - Yavne Street, documentary, 25 min., video, color.

1995 - The Silver Platter, documentary, 26 min., video, color.

1996 - Meetings with Nathan Zach, documentary, video, color.

2000 - Anemones, 17 min., video, color.

2001 - Revised Diary 1990-1999, documentary, 3 chapters 60 min. each, video, color.

2003 - My Stills 1952-2002, documentary, 58 min., video, color.

== Awards and recognition ==
1963 Bronze Medal at the Venice Film Festival for the film In Jerusalem

1963 'Director of the year', the Van Leer Jerusalem Institute

1984 Honorary member, Beit Zvi school of stage and cinematic arts

1986 Special Jury Prize, the Culture and Arts Council of Israel and the Israeli Film Institute on Diary Excerpts

1989 Canadian studies grant - the Canadian documentary film

1990 Director of the Decade, the Israeli Film Critics Association

1994 Uzi Peres lifetime achievement award of the Israel Film Academy

"Latino-American Prize" for his contribution to Israeli cinema

1995 Israeli Academy award for all his films

1999 Honorary president of the Forum of Documentary Filmmakers, February 1999

1999 Perlov was awarded the Israel Prize for his contribution to cinema.

== Retrospectives ==
2005 Israelite chronicles by a filmmaker born in Brazil, Centre Pompidou, Paris

2014 Retrospective Exhibition, Mishkan Museum of Art, Ein Harod

2017 David Perlov: Retrospective, Documenta 14, Kassel

2018 David Perlov - Filmmaker, photographer, drawer, Musee d'art et d'Histoire du Judaïsm, Paris

== See also ==
- Cinema of Israel
- Visual arts in Israel
- List of Israel Prize recipients
