= Michael K. Bourdaghs =

American scholar of Japanese culture

- Born: August 31, 1961

Academic background
- Education: Miyagi University of Education, Macalester College
- Alma mater: Cornell University

Academic work
- Discipline: Japanese studies
- Main interests: Modern literature and popular music
- Website: www.bourdaghs.com

Michael K. Bourdaghs (/ˈbərdæʃ/) is an American scholar of Japanese culture specializing in modern Japanese literature and J-pop. He is currently a professor of East Asian Languages and Civilizations at the University of Chicago.

== Biography ==
Michael K. Bourdaghs was born on August 31, 1961. He attended Miyagi University of Education from 1984 to 1985, before obtaining his B.A. in History and Japan Studies at Macalester College in Saint Paul, Minnesota. He received his M.A from Cornell University in 1993. Following this, he served as a graduate research student at Tohoku University for two years before obtaining his Ph.D. in East Asian Literature at Cornell in 1996.

He taught at the University of California, Los Angeles from 1996 to 2008. During this period, he also briefly taught as a visiting researcher at Tohoku and International Christian University. He became an associate professor at the University of Chicago in 2008 after briefly serving as a visiting associate professor the previous year. He received a full professorship at Chicago in 2012. Six years later, he was appointed the Robert S. Ingersoll Professor of East Asian Languages and Civilizations and the College. He specializes in modern Japanese literature, although has also written on the evolution of Japanese popular music. He also works as a translator.

In 2019, he was awarded a Guggenheim Fellowship, seeking to write on the history of Japanese popular culture during the Cold War.

== Bibliography ==
- The Dawn That Never Comes: Shimazaki Toson and Japanese Nationalism. Columbia University Press, 2003.
- Sayonara Amerika, Sayonara Nippon: A Geopolitical Prehistory of J-Pop. Columbia University Press, 2012.
- The Politics and Literature Debate in Postwar Japanese Criticism, 1945-52. Lexington Books, 2017.
- Literature Among the Ruins, 1945-1955: Postwar Japanese Literary Criticism. Lexington Books, 2018.
- A Fictional Commons: Natsume Sōseki and the Properties of Modern Literature. Duke University Press, 2021.
- Sound Alignments: Popular Music in Asia's Cold Wars. Duke University Press, 2021.
