= William Quillian =

William Quillian is the name of:

- William Quillian (tennis) (1934–1973), American tennis player
- William H. Quillian (fl. 1975 to present), American literary critic
- William F. Quillian, Jr. (died 2014), American president of Randolph College in Lynchburg, US
