= Maryrose Cobarrubias Mendoza =

American artist

- Born: Manila, Philippines
- Education: Otis Art Institute of Parsons School of Design; California State University, Los Angeles; Claremont Graduate University
- Occupations: Visual artist and professor
- Employer: Pasadena City College
- Known for: artwork exploring cultural assimilation
- Awards: Guggenheim Fellowship
- Website: https://www.maryrosecmendoza.com

Maryrose Cobarrubias Mendoza is an American artist who employs cultural critique to explore cultural assimilation and scale manipulation towards everyday objects. She is an associate professor and drawing coordinator at Pasadena City College, as well as a 2019 Guggenheim Fellow.

== Biography ==
Maryrose Cobarrubias Mendoza was born in Manila, Philippines, and in 1970, emigrated to Los Angeles, California, recalling that her parents "were more interested in securing the American dream". After attending the Otis Art Institute of Parsons School of Design as a foundation year student, she obtained her BA from the California State University, Los Angeles. In 1991, she obtained her MFA at Claremont Graduate University. In 2001, she became an associate professor and drawing coordinator at Pasadena City College, where she has also been part of several group exhibitions.

When her work Donut Spinal Cord was exhibited at the UC Irvine Art Gallery in 1996, Cathy Curtis of the Los Angeles Times said that her work "seem[s] open to interpretations that wander far afield". In her review of the 1996 Kayumanggi Presence exhibition at the East-West Center in Honolulu, Joan Rose of the Honolulu Star-Advertiser cited Mendoza as one of the few Filipino-American artists whose work at the exhibition she was "particularly impressed by". Robert Enright called her sculpture at the 1996 Memories of Overdevelopment traveling exhibition at Plug In Institute in Winnipeg "powerful", saying that it "is personal and political at the same time." Her work Untitled #4 was shown at the Armory Center for the Arts's 2013 Monster Drawing Rally.

In his review of her solo exhibition Truth at the YYZ Artists Outlet gallery in Toronto, Gary Michael Dault of The Globe and Mail said: "The materials of Mendoza's work are as ersatz as the age we live in. The questions she asks are as noble as faith." In 2018, her solo exhibition red, white and brown (stylized in all-lowercase) was the re-opening show of the HudsonJones Gallery in Cincinnati. She has also held several solo shows in the Greater Los Angeles area, as well as in Seattle and abroad in Seoul. In 2019, she unveiled a plaque in honor of the Japanese-American community in Monrovia, California, and she was awarded a Guggenheim Fellowship.

Her artwork explores cultural assimilation. In a review of the 2022 Invisible, Hypervisible exhibition at Dairy Arts Center in Boulder, Colorado, Renée Marino of DARIA Art Magazine said of her work If These Walls Could Talk: "upon close inspection, we discover that the images are actually a reclamation of racist sentiment from nineteenth century political cartoons". Another theme explored in her work is scale manipulation towards everyday objects; Mendoza recalls that this was inspired by Claes Oldenberg and the Fluxus community. She also said that her use of American objects was inspired by her American assimilationist upbringing.

== Selected exhibitions ==
=== Solo exhibitions ===
- Truth (1999), YYZ Artists Outlet, Toronto
- Maryrose Cobarrubias Mendoza (2003), HAUS Gallery, Pasadena, California
- Yield (2006), Solway Jones Gallery, Los Angeles
- Omitted (2010), S1F Gallery, Los Angeles
- This must be the place (2015), Commonwealth and Council, Los Angeles
- Red, White and Brown (2018), Hudson Jones Gallery, Cincinnati
- Maryrose Cobarrubias Mendoza (2019), COOP, Seoul
- Navigating Technics (2020), OCMAExpand, Orange County Museum of Art
- POP'd (2021), From Typhoon, Seattle

=== Group exhibitions ===
- Riveting: Women Artists from the Sara M. and Michelle Vance Waddell Collection (2024), Daytona Art Institute, Dayton, OH
- Charged (2023), AHL Foundation
- A Gathering Place (1995), USC Pacific Asia Museum
- Memories of Overdevelopment (1996)
- Somewhere in Between (2019), W. Keith & Janet Kellogg Art Gallery, California State Polytechnic University, Pomona
