= Portland Jewish Academy =

Private school in the United States

Location
- Portland, Oregon; United States; 45.4771728°N 122.7035294°W

Information
- Type: Private, PS-8
- Motto: PJA Proud
- Religious affiliation: Jewish
- Established: 1986
- Principal: Merrill Hendin
- Head of school: Steve Albert
- Faculty: 37
- Enrollment: 342
- Student to teacher ratio: 6:1
- Website: Official website

Portland Jewish Academy is a private school in Portland, Oregon, in the United States. The school was established in 1986 with the merging of Hillel Academy, founded in 1961, and the Jewish Education Association, which had operated a Hebrew school program since 1934.

The Hillel Academy had been founded in 1961 with about 26 students in Northwest Portland by a group of Jewish parents. In 1995 a middle school opened with six students. There were 185 total students in 2012. The school shares a campus with the Mittleman Jewish Community Center that includes a swimming pool, indoor sportsplex, gymnasium, outdoor playing fields, and a kosher café.
