= Gennaro Chierchia =

Italian linguist (born 1953)

- Born: 10 September 1953 (age 73); Rome, Italy
- Spouse: Isa Orvieto
- Children: 3
- Awards: Guggenheim Fellowship (2019)

Academic background
- Education: Sapienza University of Rome; University of Massachusetts Amherst
- Thesis: Topics in the Syntax and Semantics of Infinitives and Gerunds (1984)
- Doctoral advisor: Barbara Partee
- Influences: Tullio De Mauro; Sally McConnell-Ginet

Academic work
- Institutions: Brown University; Cornell University; University of Milan Bicocca; University of Salerno; Harvard University
- Doctoral students: Maria Aloni; Veneeta Dayal

Gennaro Chierchia (Italian pronunciation: [dʒenˈnaːro ˈkjɛrkja]; born 10 September 1953 in Rome) is an Italian linguist and educator. Chierchia is currently the Haas Foundation Professor of Linguistics and Professor of Philosophy at Harvard University. His work and study focus on areas including semantics, pragmatics, philosophy of language, and language pathology.

== Career ==
Born in Rome, Chierchia received his Bachelor of Arts in Philosophy from the Sapienza University of Rome in 1977, when he studied under Tullio De Mauro. He then went on to earn a Doctor of Philosophy in Linguistics at the University of Massachusetts Amherst in 1984. His dissertation, chaired by Barbara Partee, was titled "Topics in the Syntax and Semantics of Infinitives and Gerunds."

Chierchia began his professorial career when he served as Assistant Professor of Linguistics at Brown University from 1983 to 1985. He then continued in the same role at Cornell University from 1985 to 1992, before moving back to his native Italy. From 1992 to 2000, Chierchia taught as a full professor at the University of Milan Bicocca, including a year at the University of Salerno from 1994 to 1995. Since 2006, he has taught at Harvard University as the Haas Foundations Professor of Linguistics and Professor of Philosophy.

In 2014, Chierchia was named as Fellow of the Linguistic Society of America. In 2019, he was awarded a Guggenheim Fellowship.

== Works ==
- Meaning and Grammar: An Introduction to Semantics, 1990. ISBN 978-0262531641
- Dynamics of Meaning: Anaphora, Presupposition, and the Theory of Grammar, 1995. ISBN 0-226-10435-4
- Logic in Grammar: Polarity, Free Choice, and Intervention, 2013. ISBN 978-0199697984

== See also ==
- List of Fellows of the Linguistic Society of America
- List of Guggenheim Fellowships awarded in 2019
- List of Harvard University people
- List of University of Massachusetts Amherst alumni
