= Susanna Berger =

American art historian

- Awards: Guggenheim Fellowship (2019)

Academic background
- Education: Columbia University (BA); University of Cambridge (MPhil, PhD)

Academic work
- Discipline: Art history
- Institutions: University of Southern California

Susanna Berger is an American art historian. She is associate professor of Art History and Philosophy at the University of Southern California.

== Biography ==
Berger received her B.A. in philosophy from Columbia University in 2007. She then earned her MPhil and Ph.D. from the University of Cambridge in 2012. Her scholarship focuses on the intersections between visual art and intellectual history in Early modern Europe. From 2013 to 2016, she was a member of The Princeton Society of Fellows in the Liberal Arts, and she joined the faculty of the University of Southern California in 2016.

She received a Guggenheim Fellowship in 2019 for Fine Arts Research. In 2017–2018, she was a fellow at Villa I Tatti of Harvard University. Her book, The Art of Philosophy: Visual Thinking in Europe from the Late Renaissance to the Early Enlightenment, received the 2018 Ronald H. Bainton Prize from the Sixteenth Century Society and Conference for the best book in English in the field of early modern art or music.
