= Lincoln Quillian =

American sociologist specializing in racial segregation

- Education: University of Chicago, Harvard University
- Known for: Work on social stratification and racial segregation
- Scientific career
- Fields: Sociology
- Workplaces: Northwestern University
- Thesis: The dynamics of concentrated urban poverty (1997)
- Doctoral advisor: Christopher Winship

Lincoln Grey Quillian is an American sociologist. He is currently a professor in the Department of Sociology at Northwestern University, where he is also a faculty fellow at the Institute for Policy Research. His work focuses on social stratification, racial segregation, and racial attitudes. For example, he was the lead author of a 2017 meta-analysis which showed that rates of discrimination against African Americans in field experiments had not significantly changed since 1989.

Quillian was awarded a Guggenheim Fellowship in 2019.

== Education ==
Quillian received his B.A. in sociology from The University of Chicago in 1991. He then received his M.A. and Ph.D. from Harvard University in sociology in 1993 and 1997, respectively.
