= Deborah Zlotsky =

American visual artist

- Born: 1962 (age 62–63); Los Angeles, CA, US
- Education: University of Connecticut; Yale University
- Known for: Painting, drawings, textiles
- Awards: Guggenheim Fellowship; New York Foundation for the Arts
- Website: Deborah Zlotsky

Deborah Zlotsky (born 1962) is an American abstract artist who works on painting, drawing and textiles. Zlotsky's works are informed by art history, including early Renaissance frescoes and Old Masters, Surrealism, and the countercultural color and forms of psychedelia and Pop art; her work has been likened to that of contemporary painters Thomas Nozkowski and Terry Winters.

Her vivid paintings combine soft geometric shapes, perspectival planes and unruly marks in interconnected, overlapping compositions that suggest bodily or architectural systems and networks. She uses abstraction as a metaphorical language to convey oblique narratives involving identity, human relationships, emotional states, and the complexity of contemporary life. Author Carmen Maria Machado characterized Zlotsky's paintings as "at their essence, a convergence of Renaissance images and pop art, of the past and present, of science fiction and reality, of physicality and illusion."

Zlotsky was awarded a Guggenheim Fellowship in 2019 and New York Foundation for the Arts (NYFA) fellowships prior to that. Her work belongs to the public art collections of the RISD Museum, William Benton Museum of Art, and Albany Institute of History and Art, among others. Zlotsky teaches at the Rhode Island School of Design (RISD) and lives in the Hudson Valley, New York.

== Life and career ==
Deborah Zlotsky, Diaspora 3, oil on canvas, 50" x 80", 2023.

Zlotsky was born in Los Angeles in 1962. She graduated from Yale University with a BA in art history in 1985 and earned an MFA in painting and drawing from the University of Connecticut in 1989. Art history studies were her entry into art-making and her early work was figurative, with imagery and forms referencing disparate 17th-19th century European and American painting sources.

Zlotsky has had solo exhibitions at institutions including the Studio Art Center International (SACI) in Florence, Italy (2015) and Zillman Museum (2022), as well as galleries such as Kathryn Markel Fine Arts (2011–21) and McKenzie Fine Art (2023) in New York and Robischon Gallery (2015–22) in Denver, among others. She has appeared in group shows at the Center for Maine Contemporary Art, Dorsky Museum, Islip Art Museum, RISD Museum and University Art Museum at SUNY Albany.

Zlotsky has taught at RISD since 2013, and previously, at the College of Saint Rose and University of Northern Iowa.

== Work and reception ==
Deborah Zlotsky, The causes enumerated, oil on canvas, 36" x 36", 2013.

Zlotsky's abstract paintings fuse incongruities such as geometric and biomorphic forms, flatness and trompe-l'oeil, and intention and accident. Critics have characterized them as monumental and dramatic, with arrangements of projecting blocky forms, bands of color and receding spaces that take on a cubist or Escher-like architectural quality (e.g., The causes enumerated, 2013). Up close, the paintings reveal worn textured surfaces dense with drips, smears, tape marks and abrasions—physical imperfections that trace the history of the making. Tang Museum curator Rebecca McNamara wrote, "On her canvases, the disparate don't so much blur as coexist: among and within the cleanly wrought lines, the intentional and accidental marks and smudges, the sanded-down and built-up layers, and the colors that vibrate, complement, or balance."

Zlotsky's works emerge from an intuitive process that begins with first marks, shapes and color that act as catalysts for further action and discovery. Critic Peter Malone commented, "Each painting is a visual layering of adjustment and resolution ... processes revealed by pentimenti, scarring and other signs of manual adjustment are reformulated into illusions of sculptural relief." Zlotsky sometimes furthers this effect through sparingly employed passages of trompe-l'oeil shadowing that suggest pseudo-structural supports or conduits (e.g., brackets or rods in Risk Masquerading as a Promise and Loophole, 2019) and create ambiguity amid otherwise graphic forms.

Working responsively, the artist continually accumulates and revises relationships between elements to find unexpected affiliations, anomalies and anthropomorphic possibilities that connect abstract visual language to lived experience. The interplay between flatness, hard-edged abstraction and softer organic passages give way to depth, quasi-figuration and intimations of narrative meaning. Zlotsky's recurrent themes revolve around family dynamics, identity and cultural inheritance; gender; subjective internal states; and the unpredictability and blur of time characteristic of contemporary existence.

In her exhibition, "Today Is Yesterday and Tomorrow" (McKenzie Fine Art, 2023), Zlotsky explored Jewishness and assimilation. The "Diaspora" paintings featured emerging, disappearing and reappearing abstract colored shapes that evoke people moving across time (e.g., Diaspora 3, 2023); other works employed variably legible symbols of Judaica—the number seven, chai ("life") and a striped tallit (prayer shawl); the "Ill-fated ancient symbol" series confronted the swastika, both rendering and revising it into disorder.

=== Drawings and textile works ===
Deborah Zlotsky, Munter, graphite on mylar, 50" x 48", 2010.

Zlotsky's earlier drawings are more limited in color than her paintings, with vaporous, organic forms that have been likened to glimpses of the insides of porous bodies, imaginary or alien creatures, and exotic plants (e.g., Munter, 2010). Begun in 2005, the "LifeLike" series was made with powdered graphite spread, blown, erased, wiped and smudged on mylar. The series' titles fabricated from sound fragments (e.g., Manklewee, Primblurter) matched the visual impression of the work, which critic Josef Woodard described as "beguilingly strange" and operating in a "mysterious between-zone, at once vivid and vague" that bridged the anatomical and metaphysical. Zlotsky's recent drawings visually align more with her paintings.

Zlotsky's textile works are composed of assemblages of repurposed vintage silk scarves with added crocheted passages. Begun within the context of COVID-19 sheltering in 2020, they share the accumulating logic and visual fluidity between parts of her paintings. These works explore themes related to gender and cultural history, the passage of time, and the appreciation of both 1960s and 1970s design sensibilities and often-undervalued craft impulses.

== Collections and other recognition ==
Zlotsky has received a Guggenheim Fellowship (2019), New York Foundation for the Arts grants (2018, 2012) and awards from Arts Center of the Capital Region (2025) and the Studio Art Center International (SACI) (2015). She has been awarded artist residencies from the Bemis Center for Contemporary Arts, Bogliasco Foundation, MacDowell, Ox-Bow, Ragdale Foundation, Virginia Center for the Creative Arts, and Yaddo, among others.

Her work belongs to the public art collections of the Albany Institute of History and Art, Borusan Contemporary Art (Istanbul), RISD Museum, Rutgers University, Waldorf Astoria, and William Benton Museum of Art, as well as private collections. She was commissioned to create the permanent digital print mural, Flight Plans (2020), and three temporary murals, Flight Patterns (2019), for the Albany International Airport. The latter works were floor-to-ceiling, geometric murals painted directly on walls that Zlotsky based on paper airplanes folded by airport employees, which she unfolded and reworked into new compositions of triangular shapes.
