= Lena Salaymeh =

American academic

- Awards: Guggenheim Fellowship (2019)

Academic background
- Education: University of California, Berkeley (BA); Harvard Law School (MA, PhD)
- Thesis: Late antique and medieval Islamic legal histories: contextual changes and comparative (re)considerations (2012)
- Doctoral advisor: Ira M. Lapidus

Academic work
- Sub-discipline: Law and religion
- Institutions: Tel Aviv University; Max Planck Institute for Comparative and International Private Law; École pratique des hautes études

Lena Salaymeh is an academic specializing in law and religion. She won the 2017 American Academy of Religion Book Award in Textual Studies for her 2016 debut book The Beginnings of Islamic Law: Late Antique Islamicate Legal Traditions and is a 2019 Guggenheim Fellow. She was director of the Max Planck Institute for Comparative and International Private Law's Decolonial Law Project from 2019 to 2023.

== Biography ==
Salaymeh studied at the University of California, Berkeley, where she obtained a BA in Comparative Literature and Near Eastern Studies and an MA and PhD in History, Legal & Middle Eastern. She also obtained a JD from Harvard Law School. Her doctoral dissertation Late antique and medieval Islamic legal histories: contextual changes and comparative (re)considerations was supervised by Ira M. Lapidus.

Salaymeh worked at the Tel Aviv University Faculty of Law as an Associate Professor of Law. She worked at the Max Planck Institute for Comparative and International Private Law as a senior research fellow and founded their Decolonial Law Project, serving as that program's director from 2019 to 2023. She has also served as director of studies at the École pratique des hautes études's religious studies department. She has also held several visiting positions, including as a 2018-2019 Visiting Associate Research Scholar at Princeton University's Shelby Cullom Davis Center and as a 2020 British Academy-University of Oxford Global Professor.

Salaymeh specializes in law and religion. In 2016, her first book, The Beginnings of Islamic Law: Late Antique Islamicate Legal Traditions, was published by Cambridge University Press, with severed of its parts inspired by her doctoral dissertation. She won the 2017 American Academy of Religion Book Award in Textual Studies for her book. In 2019, she was awarded a Guggenheim Fellowship in Law. She also lectured at the Brown University Center for Middle East Studies in February 2023. She has written op-eds for Informed Comment and Opinio Juris.

== Works ==
- The Beginnings of Islamic Law: Late Antique Islamicate Legal Traditions (2017) (Note: Reviews of this book:)
