= Diary (1983 film) =

- Theatrical release poster
- יומן
- Directed by: David Perlov
- Screenplay by: David Perlov
- Produced by: Mira Perlov
- Starring: Klaus Kinski; David Perlov; Mira Perlov; Naomi Perlov; Yael Perlov; Claude Lanzmann; Joris Ivens; André Schwarz-Bart; Irving Howe; Isaac Stern; Nathan Zach; Dahlia Ravikovitch; Abraham ´Abrasza’ Zemsz
- Narrated by: David Perlov
- Cinematography: Gadi Danzig; Yahin Hirsch; David Perlov; Joseph Zicherman; Liviu Carmely; Ruth Walk; Itzik Portal; Reuven Hecker
- Edited by: Dan Arav; Noga Darevski; Jacques Ehrlich; Boaz Leon; Yael Perlov; Shalev Vines; Levi Zini; Yosef Greenfield; Bat Sheva Yancu; Liran Atzmor; Dan Muggia
- Music by: Shem Tov Levi
- Production companies: Channel 4; Keshet Media Group; JCS Productions; Belfilms Ltd.; Channel 8; The Israeli Film Service; Telemedia Productions
- Release date: 11 June 1983 (Tel Aviv Museum of Art)
- Running time: 630 Minutes
- Country: Israel
- Language: Hebrew

Diary (Hebrew: יומן, tr. Yoman) is a 1983 Israeli experimental independent documentary art film directed by David Perlov, notable for being, together with its three follow-ups, פגישות עם 1990-1999, יומן מעודכן, נתן זך and 1952-2002 תצלומי, the last based on his photography of fifty years, and one of the longest films ever made. It was released on DVD by Re:Voir Vidéo in 2006, and is considered by some to be the greatest and most important Israeli film ever made in its home country.

== Synopsis ==
In early 1973, Perlov bought a 16 mm film camera. Told in eleven parts, the film focuses on the life of Perlov and his family in the years 1952–2002, showcasing his life and the developments in area politics, while Perlov himself narrates. Several portions show Perlov visiting São Paulo, his place of origin.

== Release ==
It was released on cable television in Israel and on Channel 4. It also was shown in Israeli theaters, in the Museum of Modern Art (MOMA) in New York City, and in the Centre Georges Pompidou in Paris.
