= Thorsten Trimpop =

German-American documentary filmmaker, visual artist and professor

- Born: Lüdenscheid, Germany
- Occupation(s): Director, writer, cinematographer, producer
- Years active: 2002–present

Thorsten Trimpop is a German-American documentary filmmaker and professor. He was awarded a Guggenheim Fellowship in 2019.

== Life and career ==
Thorsten was born in Lüdenscheid, Germany. He is an alum of University of Siegen and the Konrad Wolf Film University of Babelsberg.

In 2016, Thorsten's directed the documentary film, Furusato, which premiered at DOK Leipzig and won the Golden Dove Award. He taught at the School of the Art Institute of Chicago, Harvard University, and the Massachusetts Institute of Technology. He is currently an associate professor in the Department of Critical Media Practices at the University of Colorado Boulder.

=== The Irrational Remains ===
Thorsten wrote and directed his first feature documentary, The Irrational Remains (German: Der irrationale Rest), shot on 35mm. The film tells the story of three young friends from East Berlin, two of whom attempted to escape the GDR only to be caught and imprisoned in 1987. Sixteen years later, the trio, all of whom remained in Berlin after the wall fell but never tried to find one another, are finally ready to see each other again. As they take turns telling their stories, they return to their pasts—the frontier forest through which they fled, the prison cells in which they were tortured—and confront feelings of betrayal, by their country, their families, and each other. The viewer is left to judge for his or herself the motivations and justifications of the three protagonists. Thorsten was still in film school when The Irrational Remains premiered at the Berlin International Film Festival in 2006, where it won the International Federation of Film Societies prize. It had a cinematic release in Germany and screened at the Vienna International Film Festival, Marseille International Film Festival, Buenos Aires International Festival of Independent Cinema, International Documentary Film Festival Amsterdam and more.

== Personal life ==
Thorsten lives in Boulder, Colorado with his wife, the art critic Megan O’Grady.

== Filmography ==
Year	Title	Contribution	Note
2002	Swimming Underground	Director	Documentary short
2003	The Last Day	Director and writer	Documentary short
2006	The Irrational Remains	Director and writer	Documentary
2008	24 Hours Berlin	Director	Documentary
2016	Furusato	Director, writer, cinematographer and producer	Documentary

== Awards and nominations ==
Year	Result	Award	Category	Work	Ref.
1997	Won	Berlin International Film Festival	Don Quixote Award	The Irrational Remains	
2016	Won	Dok Leipzig	Golden Dove Award	Furusato	
