= SYNTAX =

Compiler-generation system

- Developer: INRIA
- Type: Generator
- License: CeCILL
- Website: sourcesup.renater.fr/projects/syntax

SYNTAX is a system used to generate lexical and syntactic analyzers (parsers) (both deterministic and non-deterministic) for all kinds of context-free grammars (CFGs) as well as some classes of contextual grammars. It has been developed at INRIA in France for several decades, mostly by Pierre Boullier, but has become free software since 2007 only. SYNTAX is distributed under the CeCILL license.

== Context-free parsing ==
SYNTAX handles most classes of deterministic (unambiguous) grammars (LR, LALR, RLR as well as general context-free grammars. The deterministic version has been used in operational contexts (e.g., Ada), and is currently used both in the domain of compilation. The non-deterministic features include an Earley parser generator used for natural language processing. Parsers generated by SYNTAX include powerful error recovery mechanisms, and allow the execution of semantic actions and attribute evaluation on the abstract tree or on the shared parse forest.

== Contextual parsing ==
The current version of SYNTAX (version 6.0 beta) includes also parser generators for other formalisms, used for natural language processing as well as bio-informatics. These formalisms are context-sensitive formalisms (TAG, RCG or formalisms that rely on context-free grammars and are extended thanks to attribute evaluation, in particular for natural language processing (LFG).

== Error recovery ==
A nice feature of SYNTAX (compared to Lex/Yacc) is its built-in algorithm for automatically recovering from lexical and syntactic errors, by deleting extra characters or tokens, inserting missing characters or tokens, permuting characters or tokens, etc. This algorithm has a default behaviour that can be modified by providing a custom set of recovery rules adapted to the language for which the lexer and parser are built.
