= Deterministic parsing =

Parsing related to computer science

In natural language processing, deterministic parsing refers to parsing algorithms that do not backtrack. LR-parsers are an example. (This meaning of the words "deterministic" and "non-deterministic" differs from that used to describe nondeterministic algorithms.)

The deterministic behavior is desired and expected in compiling programming languages. In natural language processing, it was thought for a long time that deterministic parsing is impossible due to ambiguity inherent in natural languages (many sentences have more than one plausible parse). Thus, non-deterministic approaches such as the chart parser had to be applied. However, Mitch Marcus proposed in 1978 the Parsifal parser that was able to deal with ambiguities while still keeping the deterministic behavior.

== See also ==
- Deterministic context-free grammar
