= Precedence parser =

Precedence parser may refer to:

- Simple precedence parser
- Operator precedence parser
