= Left corner parser =

Type of chart parser

In computer science, a left corner parser is a type of chart parser used for parsing context-free grammars. It combines the top-down and bottom-up approaches of parsing. The name derives from the use of the left corner of the grammar's production rules.

An early description of a left corner parser is "A Syntax-Oriented Translator" by Peter Zilahy Ingerman.
