= Recursive ascent parser =

In computer science, recursive ascent parsing is a technique for implementing an LR parser which uses mutually-recursive functions rather than tables. Thus, the parser is directly encoded in the host language similar to recursive descent. Direct encoding usually yields a parser which is faster than its table-driven equivalent for the same reason that compilation is faster than interpretation. It is also (nominally) possible to hand edit a recursive ascent parser, whereas a tabular implementation is nigh unreadable to the average human.

Recursive ascent was first described by Thomas Pennello in his article Pennello, Thomas J. (1986). "Very fast LR parsing". Proceedings of the 1986 SIGPLAN symposium on Compiler construction - SIGPLAN '86. pp. 145–151. doi:10.1145/12276.13326. ISBN 0897911970. S2CID 17214407. in 1986. He was not intending to create a hand-editable implementation of an LR parser, but rather a maintainable and efficient parser implemented in assembly language. The technique was later expounded upon by G.H. Roberts in 1988 as well as in an article by Leermakers, Augusteijn, Kruseman Aretz in 1992 in the journal Theoretical Computer Science. An extremely readable description of the technique was written by Morell and Middleton in 2003. A good exposition can also be found in a TOPLAS article by Sperber and Thiemann.

Recursive ascent has also been merged with recursive descent, yielding a technique known as recursive ascent/descent. This implementation technique is arguably easier to hand-edit due to the reduction in states and fact that some of these states are more intuitively top-down rather than bottom up. It can also yield some minimal performance improvements over conventional recursive ascent.

== Summary ==
Intuitively, recursive ascent is a literal implementation of the LR parsing concept. Each function in the parser represents a single LR automaton state. Within each function, a multi-branch statement is used to select the appropriate action based on the current token read from the input stream. Once the token has been identified, action is taken based on the state being encoded. There are two different fundamental actions which may be taken based on the token in question:

- Shift - Encoded as a function call, effectively jumping to a new automaton state.
- Reduce - Encoded differently according to the semantic action routine for the relevant production. The result of this routine is wrapped in an ADT which is returned to the caller. The reduce action must also record the number of tokens which were shifted prior to the reduce, passing this value back to the caller along with the reduce value. This shift counter determines at which point up the call stack the reduce should be handled.

There is also a third LR automaton action which may be taken in a given state, but only after a reduce where the shift counter has decremented to zero (indicating that the current state should handle the result). This is the goto action, which is essentially a special case of shift designed to handle non-terminals in a production. This action must be handled after the multi-branch statement, since this is where any reduction results will "resurface" from farther down the call stack.

== Example ==
Consider the following grammar in bison syntax:

expr : expr '+' term   { $$ = $1 + $3; }
     | expr '-' term   { $$ = $1 - $3; }
     | term            { $$ = $1; }
     ;

term : '(' expr ')'    { $$ = $2; }
     | num             { $$ = $1; }
     ;

num : '0'              { $$ = 0; }
    | '1'              { $$ = 1; }
    ;

This grammar is LR(0) in that it is left-recursive (in the expr non-terminal) but does not require any lookahead. Recursive ascent is also capable of handling grammars which are LALR(1) in much the same way that table-driven parsers handle such cases (by pre-computing conflict resolutions based on possible lookahead).

The following is a Scala implementation of a recursive ascent parser based on the above grammar:

object ExprParser {
  private type Result = (NonTerminal, Int)
  
  private sealed trait NonTerminal {
    val v: Int
  }
  
  private case class NTexpr(v: Int, in: Stream[Char]) extends NonTerminal
  private case class NTterm(v: Int, in: Stream[Char]) extends NonTerminal
  private case class NTnum(v: Int, in: Stream[Char]) extends NonTerminal
  
  class ParseException(msg: String) extends RuntimeException(msg) {
    def this() = this("")
    
    def this(c: Char) = this(c.toString)
  }
  
  def parse(in: Stream[Char]) = state0(in)._1.v
  
  /*
   * 0 $accept: . expr $end
   *
   * '('  shift, and go to state 1
   * '0'  shift, and go to state 2
   * '1'  shift, and go to state 3
   *
   * expr  go to state 4
   * term  go to state 5
   * num   go to state 6
   */
  private def state0(in: Stream[Char]) = in match {
    case cur #:: tail => {
      def loop(tuple: Result): Result = {
        val (res, goto) = tuple
        
        if (goto == 0) {
          loop(res match {
            case NTexpr(v, in) => state4(in, v)
            case NTterm(v, in) => state5(in, v)
            case NTnum(v, in) => state6(in, v)
          })
        } else (res, goto - 1)
      }
      
      loop(cur match {
        case '(' => state1(tail)
        case '0' => state2(tail)
        case '1' => state3(tail)
        case c => throw new ParseException(c)
      })
    }
    
    case Stream() => throw new ParseException
  }
  
  /*
   * 4 term: '(' . expr ')'
   *
   * '('  shift, and go to state 1
   * '0'  shift, and go to state 2
   * '1'  shift, and go to state 3
   *
   * expr  go to state 7
   * term  go to state 5
   * num   go to state 6
   */
  private def state1(in: Stream[Char]): Result = in match {
    case cur #:: tail => {
      def loop(tuple: Result): Result = {
        val (res, goto) = tuple
        
        if (goto == 0) {
          loop(res match {
            case NTexpr(v, in) => state7(in, v)
            case NTterm(v, in) => state5(in, v)
            case NTnum(v, in) => state6(in, v)
          })
        } else (res, goto - 1)
      }
      
      loop(cur match {
        case '(' => state1(tail)
        case '0' => state2(tail)
        case '1' => state3(tail)
        case c => throw new ParseException(c)
      })
    }
    
    case Stream() => throw new ParseException
  }
  
  /*
   * 6 num: '0' .
   *
   * $default  reduce using rule 6 (num)
   */
  private def state2(in: Stream[Char]) = (NTnum(0, in), 0)
  
  /*
   * 7 num: '1' .
   *
   * $default  reduce using rule 7 (num)
   */
  private def state3(in: Stream[Char]) = (NTnum(1, in), 0)
  
  /*
   * 0 $accept: expr . $end
   * 1 expr: expr . '+' term
   * 2     | expr . '-' term
   *
   * $end  shift, and go to state 8
   * '+'   shift, and go to state 9
   * '-'   shift, and go to state 10
   */
  private def state4(in: Stream[Char], arg1: Int): Result = in match {
    case cur #:: tail => {
      decrement(cur match {
        case '+' => state9(tail, arg1)
        case '-' => state10(tail, arg1)
        case c => throw new ParseException(c)
      })
    }
    
    case Stream() => state8(arg1)
  }
  
  /*
   * 3 expr: term .
   *
   * $default  reduce using rule 3 (expr)
   */
  private def state5(in: Stream[Char], arg1: Int) = (NTexpr(arg1, in), 0)
  
  /*
   * 5 term: num .
   *
   * $default  reduce using rule 5 (term)
   */
  private def state6(in: Stream[Char], arg1: Int) = (NTterm(arg1, in), 0)
  
  /*
   * 1 expr: expr . '+' term
   * 2     | expr . '-' term
   * 4 term: '(' expr . ')'
   *
   * '+'  shift, and go to state 9
   * '-'  shift, and go to state 10
   * ')'  shift, and go to state 11
   */
  private def state7(in: Stream[Char], arg1: Int): Result = in match {
    case cur #:: tail => {
      decrement(cur match {
        case '+' => state9(tail, arg1)
        case '-' => state10(tail, arg1)
        case ')' => state11(tail, arg1)
        case c => throw new ParseException(c)
      })
    }
    
    case Stream() => throw new ParseException
  }
  
  /*
   * 0 $accept: expr $end .
   *
   * $default  accept
   */
  private def state8(arg1: Int) = (NTexpr(arg1, Stream()), 1)
  
  /*
   * 1 expr: expr '+' . term
   *
   * '('  shift, and go to state 1
   * '0'  shift, and go to state 2
   * '1'  shift, and go to state 3
   *
   * term  go to state 12
   * num   go to state 6
   */
  private def state9(in: Stream[Char], arg1: Int) = in match {
    case cur #:: tail => {
      def loop(tuple: Result): Result = {
        val (res, goto) = tuple
        
        if (goto == 0) {
          loop(res match {
            case NTterm(v, in) => state12(in, arg1, v)
            case NTnum(v, in) => state6(in, v)
            case _ => throw new AssertionError
          })
        } else (res, goto - 1)
      }
      
      loop(cur match {
        case '(' => state1(tail)
        case '0' => state2(tail)
        case '1' => state3(tail)
        case c => throw new ParseException(c)
      })
    }
    
    case Stream() => throw new ParseException
  }
  
  /*
   * 2 expr: expr '-' . term
   *
   * '('  shift, and go to state 1
   * '0'  shift, and go to state 2
   * '1'  shift, and go to state 3
   *
   * term  go to state 13
   * num   go to state 6
   */
  private def state10(in: Stream[Char], arg1: Int) = in match {
    case cur #:: tail => {
      def loop(tuple: Result): Result = {
        val (res, goto) = tuple
        
        if (goto == 0) {
          loop(res match {
            case NTterm(v, in) => state13(in, arg1, v)
            case NTnum(v, in) => state6(in, v)
            case _ => throw new AssertionError
          })
        } else (res, goto - 1)
      }
      
      loop(cur match {
        case '(' => state1(tail)
        case '0' => state2(tail)
        case '1' => state3(tail)
        case c => throw new ParseException(c)
      })
    }
    
    case Stream() => throw new ParseException
  }
  
  /*
   * 4 term: '(' expr ')' .
   *
   * $default  reduce using rule 4 (term)
   */
  private def state11(in: Stream[Char], arg1: Int) = (NTterm(arg1, in), 2)
  
  /*
   * 1 expr: expr '+' term .
   *
   * $default  reduce using rule 1 (expr)
   */
  private def state12(in: Stream[Char], arg1: Int, arg2: Int) = (NTexpr(arg1 + arg2, in), 2)
  
  /*
   * 2 expr: expr '-' term .
   *
   * $default  reduce using rule 2 (expr)
   */
  private def state13(in: Stream[Char], arg1: Int, arg2: Int) = (NTexpr(arg1 - arg2, in), 2)
  
  private def decrement(tuple: Result) = {
    val (res, goto) = tuple
    assert(goto != 0)
    (res, goto - 1)
  }
}

The following is a Prolog implementation of a recursive ascent parser based on the above grammar:

state(S), [S] --> [S].
state(S0, S), [S] --> [S0].


/*
    0. S --> E$
    1. E --> E + T
    2. E --> E - T
    3. E --> T
    4. T --> (E)
    5. T --> N
    6. N --> 0
    7. N --> 1
*/
accept --> state(s([], [e(_)])).
r(1) --> state(s(Ts, [t(A1), '+', e(A0)|Ss]), s(Ts, [e(A0+A1)|Ss])).
r(2) --> state(s(Ts, [t(A1), '-', e(A0)|Ss]), s(Ts, [e(A0-A1)|Ss])).
r(3) --> state(s(Ts, [t(A)|Ss]), s(Ts, [e(A)|Ss])).
r(4) --> state(s(Ts, [')', e(A), '('|Ss]), s(Ts, [t(A)|Ss])).
r(5) --> state(s(Ts, [n(A)|Ss]), s(Ts, [t(A)|Ss])).
r(6) --> state(s(Ts, ['0'|Ss]), s(Ts, [n(0)|Ss])).
r(7) --> state(s(Ts, ['1'|Ss]), s(Ts, [n(1)|Ss])).
t(T) --> state(s([T|Ts], Ss), s(Ts, [T|Ss])).


/*
    S --> .E$
    E --> .E + T
    E --> .E - T
    E --> .T
    T --> .(E)
    T --> .N
    N --> .0
    N --> .1
*/
s0 --> t('('), s3, s2, s1.
s0 --> t('0'), s11, s10, s2, s1.
s0 --> t('1'), s12, s10, s2, s1.

/*
    S --> E.$
    E --> E. + T
    E --> E. - T
*/
s1 --> accept.
s1 --> t('+'), s7, s1.
s1 --> t('-'), s8, s1.

/*
    E --> T.
*/
s2 --> r(3).

/*
    T --> (.E)
    E --> .E + T
    E --> .E - T
    E --> .T
    T --> .(E)
    T --> .N
    N --> .0
    N --> .1
*/
s3 --> t('('), s3, s2, s4.
s3 --> t('0'), s11, s10, s2, s4.
s3 --> t('1'), s12, s10, s2, s4.

/*
    T --> (E.)
    E --> E .+ T
    E --> E .- T
*/
s4 --> t(')'), s9.
s4 --> t('+'), s7, s4.
s4 --> t('-'), s8, s4.

/*
    E --> E + T.
*/
s5 --> r(1).

/*
    E --> E - T.
*/
s6 --> r(2).

/*
    E --> E + .T
    T --> .(E)
    T --> .N
    N --> .0
    N --> .1
*/
s7 --> t('('), s3, s5.
s7 --> t('0'), s11, s10, s5.
s7 --> t('1'), s12, s10, s5.

/*
    E --> E - .T
    T --> .(E)
    T --> .N
    N --> .0
    N --> .1
*/
s8 --> t('('), s3, s6.
s8 --> t('0'), s11, s10, s6.
s8 --> t('1'), s12, s10, s6.

/*
    T --> (E).
*/
s9 --> r(4).

/*
    T --> N.
*/
s10 --> r(5).

/*
    N --> '0'.
*/
s11 --> r(6).

/*
    N --> '1'.
*/
s12 --> r(7).

parser(Cs, T) :-
    length(Cs, _),
    phrase(s0, [s(Cs, [])], [s([], [e(T)])]).

% state(S0, S), [S] --> [S0, S].
%?- S0 = [s("(1+1)", [])|_], phrase(s0, S0, [S]), maplist(portray_clause, S0).

== See also ==
- Recursive descent parser
