= Left corner =

Part of a production rule in a context-free grammar

In formal language theory, the left corner of a production rule in a context-free grammar is the left-most symbol on the right side of the rule.

For example, in the rule A→Xα, X is the left corner.

The left corner table associates to a symbol all possible left corners for that symbol, and the left corners of those symbols, etc.

Given the grammar

S → VP
S → NP VP
VP → V NP
NP → DET N

the left corner table is as follows.

Symbol	Left corner(s)
S	VP, NP, V, DET
NP	DET
VP	V

Left corners are used to add bottom-up filtering to a top-down parser, or top-down filtering to a bottom-up parser.
