= Bottom-up parsing =

Parsing beginning from lowest-level structures

In computer science, parsing reveals the grammatical structure of linear input text, as a first step in working out its meaning. Bottom-up parsing recognizes the text's lowest-level small details first, before its mid-level structures, and leaves the highest-level overall structure to last.

== Bottom-up versus top-down ==
The bottom-up name comes from the concept of a parse tree, in which the most detailed parts are at the bottom of the upside-down tree, and larger structures composed from them are in successively higher layers, until at the top or "root" of the tree a single unit describes the entire input stream. A bottom-up parse discovers and processes that tree starting from the bottom left end, and incrementally works its way upwards and rightwards. A parser may act on the structure hierarchy's low, mid, and highest levels without ever creating an actual data tree; the tree is then merely implicit in the parser's actions. Bottom-up parsing patiently waits until it has scanned and parsed all parts of some construct before committing to what the combined construct is.

Typical parse tree for A = B + C*2; D = 1

Bottom-up parse steps

Top-down parse steps

The opposite of this is top-down parsing, in which the input's overall structure is decided (or guessed at) first, before dealing with mid-level parts, leaving completion of all lowest-level details to last. A top-down parser discovers and processes the hierarchical tree starting from the top, and incrementally works its way first downwards and then rightwards. Top-down parsing eagerly decides what a construct is much earlier, when it has only scanned the leftmost symbol of that construct and has not yet parsed any of its parts. Left corner parsing is a hybrid method that works bottom-up along the left edges of each subtree, and top-down on the rest of the parse tree.

If a language grammar has multiple rules that may start with the same leftmost symbols but have different endings, then that grammar can be efficiently handled by a deterministic bottom-up parse but cannot be handled top-down without guesswork and backtracking. So bottom-up parsers in practice handle a somewhat larger range of computer language grammars than deterministic top-down parsers do.

Bottom-up parsing is sometimes done by backtracking. But much more commonly, bottom-up parsing is done by a shift-reduce parser such as a LALR parser.

== Examples ==
Some of the parsers that use bottom-up parsing include:

- Precedence parser
  - Simple precedence parser
  - Operator-precedence parser
- Bounded-context parser (BC)
- LR parser (Left-to-right, Rightmost derivation in reverse)
  - Simple LR parser (SLR)
  - LALR parser (Look-Ahead)
  - Canonical LR parser (LR(1))
  - GLR parser (Generalized)
- CYK parser (Cocke–Younger–Kasami)
- Recursive ascent parser
- Shift-reduce parser
