= Chart parser =

Type of parser for ambiguous grammars

In computer science, a chart parser is a type of parser suitable for ambiguous grammars (including grammars of natural languages). It uses the dynamic programming approach—partial hypothesized results are stored in a structure called a chart and can be re-used. This eliminates backtracking and prevents a combinatorial explosion.

Chart parsing is generally credited to Martin Kay.

== Types of chart parsers ==
A common approach is to use a variant of the Viterbi algorithm. The Earley parser is a type of chart parser mainly used for parsing in computational linguistics, named for its inventor. Another chart parsing algorithm is the Cocke-Younger-Kasami (CYK) algorithm.

Chart parsers can also be used for parsing computer languages. Earley parsers in particular have been used in compiler-compilers where their ability to parse using arbitrary context-free grammars eases the task of writing the grammar for a particular language. However their lower efficiency has led to people avoiding them for most compiler work.

In bidirectional chart parsing, edges of the chart are marked with a direction, either forwards or backwards, and rules are enforced on the direction in which edges must point in order to be combined into further edges.

In incremental chart parsing, the chart is constructed incrementally as the text is edited by the user, with each change to the text resulting in the minimal possible corresponding change to the chart.

Chart parsers are distinguished between top-down and bottom-up, as well as active and passive.

== See also ==
- Brute-force search
