= Approximate computing =

Computation of nearly accurate results

Approximate computing is an emerging paradigm for energy-efficient and/or high-performance design. It includes a plethora of computation techniques that return a possibly inaccurate result rather than a guaranteed accurate result, and that can be used for applications where an approximate result is sufficient for its purpose. One example of such situation is for a search engine where no exact answer may exist for a certain search query and hence, many answers may be acceptable. Similarly, occasional dropping of some frames in a video application can go undetected due to perceptual limitations of humans. Approximate computing is based on the observation that in many scenarios, although performing exact computation requires large amount of resources, allowing bounded approximation can provide disproportionate gains in performance and energy, while still achieving acceptable result accuracy. For example, in k-means clustering algorithm, allowing only 5% loss in classification accuracy can provide 50 times energy saving compared to the fully accurate classification.

The key requirement in approximate computing is that approximation can be introduced only in non-critical data, since approximating critical data (e.g., control operations) can lead to disastrous consequences, such as program crash or erroneous output.

== Strategies ==
Several strategies can be used for performing approximate computing.

Approximate circuits
Approximate arithmetic circuits: approximate adders, approximate multipliers and other logical circuits can reduce hardware overhead. For example, an approximate multi-bit adder can ignore the carry chain and thus, allow all its sub-adders to perform addition operation in parallel.
Approximate Hardware accelerators
Approximate storage and memory
Instead of storing data values exactly, they can be stored approximately, e.g., by truncating the lower-bits in floating point data. Another method is to accept less reliable memory. For this, in DRAM and eDRAM, refresh rate assignments can be lowered or controlled. In SRAM, supply voltage can be lowered or controlled. Approximate storage can be applied to reduce MRAM's high write energy consumption. In general, any error detection and correction mechanisms should be disabled.
Software-level approximation
There are several ways to approximate at software level. Memoization or fuzzy memoization (the use of a vector database for approximate retrieval from a cache, i.e. fuzzy caching) can be applied. Some iterations of loops can be skipped (termed as loop perforation) to achieve a result faster. Some tasks can also be skipped, for example when a run-time condition suggests that those tasks are not going to be useful (task skipping). Monte Carlo algorithms and Randomized algorithms trade correctness for execution time guarantees. The computation can be reformulated according to paradigms that allow easily the acceleration on specialized hardware, e.g. a neural processing unit.
Approximate system
In an approximate system, different subsystems of the system such as the processor, memory, sensor, and communication modules are synergistically approximated to obtain a much better system-level Q-E trade-off curve compared to individual approximations to each of the subsystems.

== Application areas ==
Approximate computing has been used in a variety of domains where the applications are error-tolerant, such as multimedia processing, machine learning, signal processing, scientific computing. Therefore, approximate computing is mostly driven by applications that are related to human perception/cognition and have inherent error resilience. Many of these applications are based on statistical or probabilistic computation, such as different approximations can be made to better suit the desired objectives. One notable application in machine learning is that Google is using this approach in their Tensor processing units (TPU, a custom ASIC).

== Derived paradigms ==
The main issue in approximate computing is the identification of the section of the application that can be approximated. In the case of large scale applications, it is very common to find people holding the expertise on approximate computing techniques not having enough expertise on the application domain (and vice versa). In order to solve this problem, programming paradigms have been proposed. They all have in common the clear role separation between application programmer and application domain expert. These approaches allow the spread of the most common optimizations and approximate computing techniques.

== See also ==
- Artificial neural network
- Metaheuristic
- PCMOS
- FPGA
