= Transmogrifier =

Transmogrifier may refer to:

- something that has been shapeshifting
- a fictional device in Calvin and Hobbes
- TMG (language) (TransMoGrifier), an early computer language compiler
