= Task skipping =

Task skipping is an approximate computing technique that allows to skip code blocks according to a specific boolean condition to be checked at run-time.

This technique is usually applied on the most computational-intensive section of the code.

It relies on the fact that a tuple of values sequentially computed are going to be useful only if the whole tuple meet certain conditions. Knowing that a value of the tuple invalides or probably will invalidate the whole tuple, it is possible to avoid the computation of the rest of the tuple.

== Code example ==
The example that follows provides the result of task skipping applied on this C-like source code

for (int i = 0; i < N; i++) {
    value_1 = compute_1(i);
    value_2 = compute_2(i);
}

=== Skipping a task ===
for (int i = 0; i < N; i++) {
    value_1 = compute_1(i);
    if (value_1 >= fixed_threshold) {
        value_2 = compute_2(i);
    }
}

== See also ==
- Loop perforation
- Memoization
