= Parse table =

Parse table may refer to table-driven versions of:

- an LR parser using tables derived from a grammar by a parser generator
- an LL parser using tables derived from a grammar
