= Data truncation =

In databases and computer networking data truncation occurs when data or a data stream (such as a file) is stored in a location too short to hold its entire length. Data truncation may occur automatically, such as when a long string is written to a smaller buffer, or deliberately, when only a portion of the data is wanted.

Depending on what type of data validation a program or operating system has, the data may be truncated silently (i.e., without informing the user), or the user may be given an error message.

For example, sometimes instead of rounding off a numerical value obtained from a calculation, some of the digits might just be removed i.e. truncated

== See also ==
- Fixed-point arithmetic § Precision loss and overflow
- Data loss
