= TMG (language) =

Compiler-compiler

- Designed by: Robert M. McClure
- Developer: Robert M. McClure
- First appeared: 1963; 62 years ago

Dialects
- Unix dialect (by Douglas McIlroy)

Influenced
- TROL (by Donald Knuth)

Unix TMG
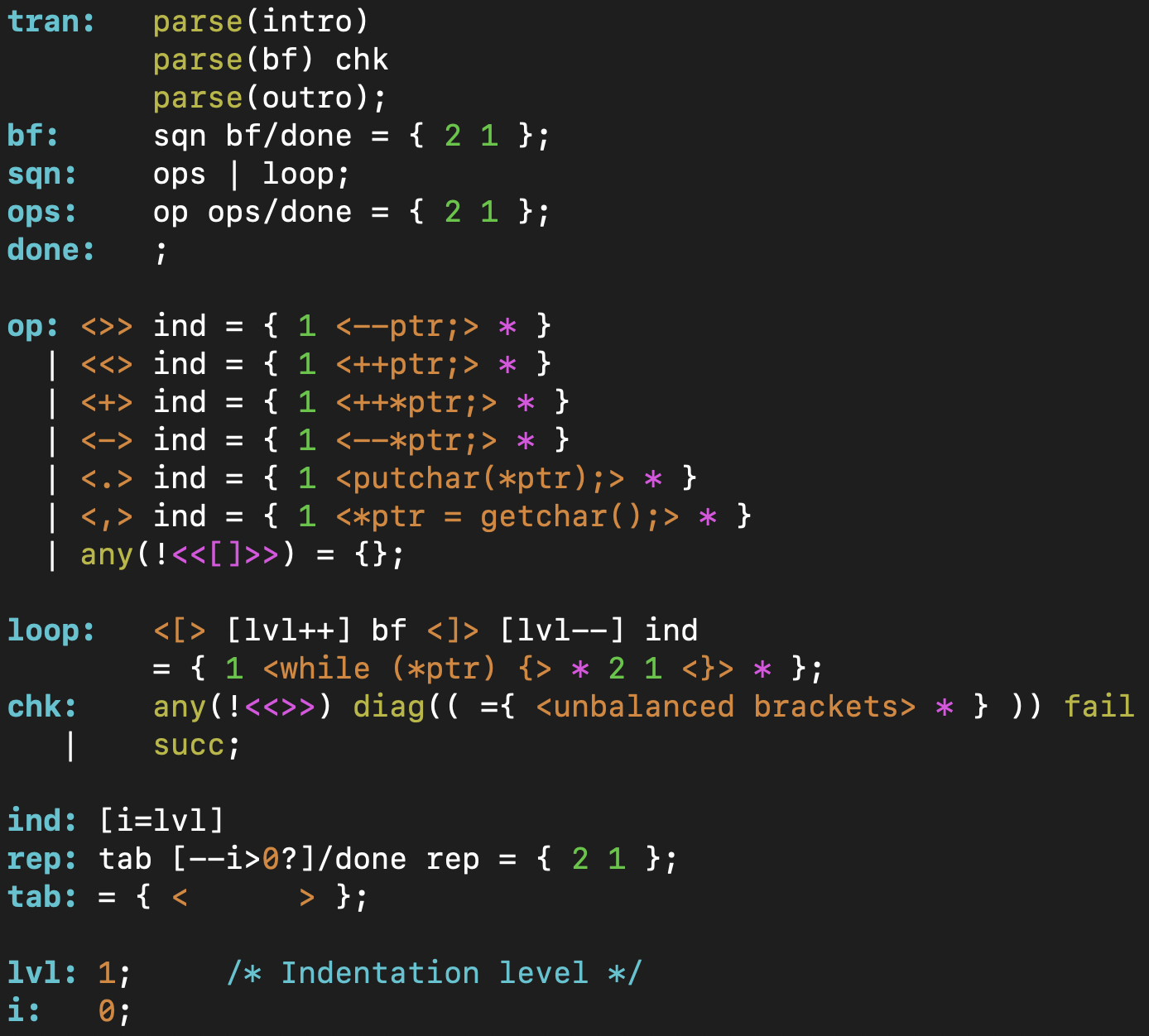
- TMG program with highlighted syntax
- Developer: Douglas McIlroy
- First appeared: 1969; 56 years ago
- Filename extensions: .t

Dialects
- PDP-7 version, PDP-11 version

Influenced by
- ALGOL 68, B, PL/I, SNOBOL

Influenced
- B, Yacc

In computing, TMG (Transmogrifier) is a recursive descent compiler-compiler developed by Robert M. McClure and presented in 1965.

== History ==
TMG ran on systems including OS/360 and early Unix. It was used to build EPL, an early version of PL/I.

Douglas McIlroy ported TMG to an early version of Unix. According to Ken Thompson, McIlroy wrote TMG in TMG on a piece of paper and "decided to give his piece of paper his piece of paper," hand-compiling assembly language that he entered and assembled on Thompson's Unix system running on PDP-7. Thompson used TMG in 1970 as a tool to offer Fortran, but due to memory limitations of PDP-7 ended up creating the B programming language which was much influenced by BCPL.

The recursive descent algorithm of TMG was studied formally by Alexander Birman and Jeffrey Ullman. The formal description of the algorithms was named TMG recognition scheme (or simply TS).

== See also ==
- Top-down parsing language
- Yacc
