= Ambiguous grammar =

Type of context-free grammar

In computer science, an ambiguous grammar is a context-free grammar for which there exists a string that can have more than one leftmost derivation or parse tree. Every non-empty context-free language admits an ambiguous grammar by introducing e.g. a duplicate rule. A language that only admits ambiguous grammars is called an inherently ambiguous language. Deterministic context-free grammars are always unambiguous, and are an important subclass of unambiguous grammars; there are non-deterministic unambiguous grammars, however.

For computer programming languages, the reference grammar is often ambiguous, due to issues such as the dangling else problem. If present, these ambiguities are generally resolved by adding precedence rules or other context-sensitive parsing rules, so the overall phrase grammar is unambiguous. Some parsing algorithms (such as Earley or GLR parsers) can generate sets of parse trees (or "parse forests") from strings that are syntactically ambiguous.

== Examples ==
=== Trivial language ===
The simplest example is the following ambiguous grammar (with start symbol A) for the trivial language that consists of only the empty string:

A → A | ε

... meaning that the nonterminal A can be derived to either itself again, or to the empty string. Thus the empty string has leftmost derivations of length 1, 2, 3, and indeed of any length, depending on how many times the rule A → A is used.

This language also has an unambiguous grammar, consisting of a single production rule:

A → ε

... meaning that the unique production can produce only the empty string, which is the unique string in the language.

In the same way, any grammar for a non-empty language can be made ambiguous by adding duplicates.

=== Unary string ===
The regular language of unary strings of a given character, say 'a' (the regular expression a*), has the unambiguous grammar:

A → aA | ε

... but also has the ambiguous grammar:

A → aA | Aa | ε

These correspond to producing a right-associative tree (for the unambiguous grammar) or allowing both left- and right- association. This is elaborated below.

=== Addition and subtraction ===
The context-free grammar

A → A + A | A − A | a

is ambiguous since there are two leftmost derivations for the string a + a + a:

A	→ A + A	A	→ A + A
	→ a + A		→ A + A + A (First A is replaced by A+A. Replacement of the second A would yield a similar derivation.)
	→ a + A + A		→ a + A + A
	→ a + a + A		→ a + a + A
	→ a + a + a		→ a + a + a

As another example, the grammar is ambiguous since there are two parse trees for the string a + a − a:

The language that it generates, however, is not inherently ambiguous; the following is a non-ambiguous grammar generating the same language:

A → A + a | A − a | a

=== Dangling else ===
A common example of ambiguity in computer programming languages is the dangling else problem. In many languages, the else in an If–then(–else) statement is optional, which results in nested conditionals having multiple ways of being recognized in terms of the context-free grammar.

Concretely, in many languages one may write conditionals in two valid forms: the if-then form, and the if-then-else form – in effect, making the else clause optional.

In a grammar containing the rules (Note: The following example uses Pascal syntax.)

Statement → if Condition then Statement |
            if Condition then Statement else Statement |
            ...
Condition → ...

some ambiguous phrase structures can appear. The expression

if a then if b then s else s2

can be parsed as either

if a then begin if b then s end else s2

or as

if a then begin if b then s else s2 end

depending on whether the else is associated with the first if or second if.

This is resolved in various ways in different languages. Sometimes the grammar is modified so that it is unambiguous, such as by requiring an endif statement or making else mandatory. In other cases the grammar is left ambiguous, but the ambiguity is resolved by making the overall phrase grammar context-sensitive, such as by associating an else with the nearest if. In this latter case the grammar is unambiguous, but the context-free grammar is ambiguous.

=== An unambiguous grammar with multiple derivations ===
The existence of multiple derivations of the same string does not suffice to indicate that the grammar is ambiguous; only multiple leftmost derivations (or, equivalently, multiple parse trees) indicate ambiguity.

For example, the simple grammar

S → A + A
A → 0 | 1

is an unambiguous grammar for the language { 0+0, 0+1, 1+0, 1+1 }. While each of these four strings has only one leftmost derivation, it has two different derivations, for example

S ⇒ A + A ⇒ 0 + A ⇒ 0 + 0

and

S ⇒ A + A ⇒ A + 0 ⇒ 0 + 0

Only the former derivation is a leftmost one.

== Recognizing ambiguous grammars ==
The decision problem of whether an arbitrary grammar is ambiguous is undecidable because it can be shown that it is equivalent to the Post correspondence problem. At least, there are tools implementing some semi-decision procedure for detecting ambiguity of context-free grammars.

The efficiency of parsing a context-free grammar is determined by the automaton that accepts it. Deterministic context-free grammars are accepted by deterministic pushdown automata and can be parsed in linear time, for example by an LR parser. They are a strict subset of the context-free grammars, which are accepted by pushdown automata and can be parsed in polynomial time, for example by the CYK algorithm.

Unambiguous context-free grammars can be nondeterministic. For example, the language of even-length palindromes on the alphabet of 0 and 1 has the unambiguous context-free grammar S → 0S0 | 1S1 | ε. An arbitrary string of this language cannot be parsed without reading all its symbols first, which means that a pushdown automaton has to try alternative state transitions to accommodate for the different possible lengths of a semi-parsed string.

Nevertheless, removing grammar ambiguity may produce a deterministic context-free grammar and thus allow for more efficient parsing. Compiler generators such as YACC include features for resolving some kinds of ambiguity, such as by using the precedence and associativity constraints.

== Inherently ambiguous languages ==
While some context-free languages (the set of strings that can be generated by a grammar) have both ambiguous and unambiguous grammars, there exist context-free languages for which no unambiguous context-free grammar exists. Such languages are called inherently ambiguous.

There are no inherently ambiguous regular languages.

The existence of inherently ambiguous context-free languages was proven with Parikh's theorem in 1961 by Rohit Parikh in an MIT research report.

The language $\{x | x=a^n b^m a^{n^{\prime}} b^m \text { or } x=a^n b^m a^n b^{m^{\prime}}, \text { where } n, n', m, m' \geq 1\}$ is inherently ambiguous.

Ogden's lemma can be used to prove that certain context-free languages, such as $\{a^nb^mc^m | m, n \geq 1\} \cup \{a^mb^mc^n | m, n \geq 1\}$, are inherently ambiguous. See Ogden's lemma § Inherent ambiguity for a proof.

The union of $\{a^n b^n c^m d^m \mid n, m > 0\}$ with $\{a^n b^m c^m d^n \mid n, m > 0\}$ is inherently ambiguous. This set is context-free, since the union of two context-free languages is always context-free. But Hopcroft & Ullman (1979) give a proof that no context-free grammar for this union language can unambiguously parse strings of form $a^n b^n c^n d^n, (n > 0)$.

More examples, and a general review of techniques for proving inherent ambiguity of context-free languages, are found given by Bassino and Nicaud (2011).

== See also ==
- GLR parser, a type of parser for ambiguous and nondeterministic grammars
- Chart parser, another type of parser for ambiguous grammars
- Syntactic ambiguity

== Citations ==
=== References ===
- Hopcroft, John E.; Ullman, Jeffrey D. (1979). Introduction to Automata Theory, Languages, and Computation (1st ed.). Addison-Wesley. ISBN 0-201-02988-X. (accessible to patrons with print disabilities)
- Hopcroft, John E.; Motwani, Rajeev; Ullman, Jeffrey D. (2006) [1979]. Introduction to Automata Theory, Languages, and Computation (3rd ed.). Addison-Wesley. ISBN 0-321-45536-3.

=== Further reading ===
- Brabrand, Claus; Giegerich, Robert; Møller, Anders (March 2010). "Analyzing Ambiguity of Context-Free Grammars". Science of Computer Programming. 75 (3). Elsevier: 176–191. doi:10.1016/j.scico.2009.11.002.
- Gross, Maurice (September 1964). "Inherent ambiguity of minimal linear grammars". Information and Control. 7 (3): 366–368. doi:10.1016/S0019-9958(64)90422-X.
- Harrison, Michael (1978). Introduction to Formal Language Theory. Addison-Wesley. ISBN 0-201-02955-3.
