= Context-free =

Context-free may refer to:

- Context-free grammar
  - Deterministic context-free grammar
  - Generalized context-free grammar
  - Probabilistic context-free grammar
  - Synchronous context-free grammar
- Context-free language
  - Deterministic context-free language

== See also ==
- Context (disambiguation)
- Free (disambiguation)
- Quoting out of context
