= Interchange lemma =

In the theory of formal languages, the interchange lemma states a necessary condition for a language to be context-free, just like the pumping lemma for context-free languages.

It states that for every context-free language $L$ there is a $c>0$ such that for all $n\geq m\geq 2$ for any collection of length $n$ words $R\subset L$ there is a $Z=\{z_1,\ldots,z_k\}\subset R$ with $k\ge |R|/(cn^2)$, and decompositions $z_i=w_ix_iy_i$ such that each of $|w_i|$, $|x_i|$, $|y_i|$ is independent of $i$, moreover, $m/2<|x_i|\leq m$, and the words $w_ix_jy_i$ are in $L$ for every $i$ and $j$.

The first application of the interchange lemma was to show that the set of repetitive strings (i.e., strings of the form $xyyz$ with $|y|>0$) over an alphabet of three or more characters is not context-free.

== See also ==
- Pumping lemma for regular languages
