= Tadao Kasami =

Japanese information theorist

Tadao Kasami (嵩忠雄, Kasami Tadao; April 12, 1930 – March 18, 2007) was a Japanese information theorist who made significant contributions to error correcting codes. The low-correlation binary sequences known as Kasami sequences are named after him and are used in spread-spectrum communications. He was the earliest to publish the key ideas for the CYK algorithm, separately discovered by Daniel Younger (1967) and John Cocke (1970).

Kasami was born in Kobe, Japan, and studied electrical engineering at Osaka University, where he received his B.E. degree in 1958, M.E. in 1960, and Ph.D. in 1963. He then joined the faculty, teaching until 1994, and was dean 1990–1992. He was subsequently professor in the Graduate School of Information Science at the Nara Institute of Science and Technology 1992–1998, and professor of information science at Hiroshima City University 1998–2004.

Kasami was an IEEE Fellow, and received the 1987 Achievement Award from the Institute of Electronics, Information, and Communications Engineers of Japan and the 1999 IEEE Claude E. Shannon Award.

== See also ==
- CYK algorithm
- Kasami code
