= Operator-precedence grammar =

An operator precedence grammar is a kind of grammar for formal languages.

Technically, an operator precedence grammar is a context-free grammar that has the property (among others) that no production has either an empty right-hand side or two adjacent nonterminals in its right-hand side. These properties allow precedence relations to be defined between the terminals of the grammar. A parser that exploits these relations is considerably simpler than more general-purpose parsers, such as LALR parsers. Operator-precedence parsers can be constructed for a large class of context-free grammars.

== Precedence relations ==
Operator precedence grammars rely on the following three precedence relations between the terminals:

Relation	Meaning
$a \lessdot b$	a yields precedence to b
$a \doteq b$	a has the same precedence as b
$a \gtrdot b$	a takes precedence over b

These operator precedence relations allow to delimit the handles in the right sentential forms: $\lessdot$ marks the left end, $\doteq$ appears in the interior of the handle, and $\gtrdot$ marks the right end. Contrary to other shift-reduce parsers, all nonterminals are considered equal for the purpose of identifying handles. The relations do not have the same properties as their un-dotted counterparts; e. g. $a \doteq b$ does not generally imply $b \doteq a$, and $b \gtrdot a$ does not follow from $a \lessdot b$. Furthermore, $a \doteq a$ does not generally hold, and $a \gtrdot a$ is possible.

Let us assume that between the terminals a_{i} and a_{i+1} there is always exactly one precedence relation. Suppose that $ is the end of the string. Then for all terminals b we define: $\$ \lessdot b$ and $b \gtrdot \$$. If we remove all nonterminals and place the correct precedence relation: $\lessdot$, $\doteq$, $\gtrdot$ between the remaining terminals, there remain strings that can be analyzed by an easily developed bottom-up parser.

=== Example ===
For example, the following operator precedence relations can be introduced for simple expressions:

$$\begin{array}{c|cccc}
& \mathrm{id}
& +
& *
& \$
\\
\hline
\mathrm{id}
&
& \gtrdot
& \gtrdot
& \gtrdot
\\
+
& \lessdot
& \gtrdot
& \lessdot
& \gtrdot
\\
*
& \lessdot
& \gtrdot
& \gtrdot
& \gtrdot
\\
\$
& \lessdot
& \lessdot
& \lessdot
&
\end{array}$$

They follow from the following facts:

- + has lower precedence than * (hence $+ \lessdot *$ and $* \gtrdot +$).
- Both + and * are left-associative (hence $+ \gtrdot +$ and $* \gtrdot *$).

The input string

$$\mathrm{id}_1 + \mathrm{id}_2 * \mathrm{id}_3$$

after adding end markers and inserting precedence relations becomes

$$\$ \lessdot \mathrm{id}_1 \gtrdot + \lessdot \mathrm{id}_2 \gtrdot * \lessdot \mathrm{id}_3 \gtrdot \$$$

== Operator precedence parsing ==
Having precedence relations allows to identify handles as follows:

- scan the string from left until seeing $\gtrdot$
- scan backwards (from right to left) over any $\doteq$ until seeing $\lessdot$
- everything between the two relations $\lessdot$ and $\gtrdot$, including any intervening or surrounding nonterminals, forms the handle

It is generally not necessary to scan the entire sentential form to find the handle.

== Operator precedence parsing algorithm ==
The algorithm below is from Aho et al.:

If $ is on the top of the stack and ip points to $ then return
else
    Let a be the top terminal on the stack, and b the symbol pointed to by ip
    if a 
  
    
      
        ⋖
      
    
    {\displaystyle \lessdot }
  
 b or a 
  
    
      
        ≐
      
    
    {\displaystyle \doteq }
  
 b then
        push b onto the stack
        advance ip to the next input symbol
    else if a 
  
    
      
        ⋗
      
    
    {\displaystyle \gtrdot }
  
 b then
        repeat
            pop the stack
        until the top stack terminal is related by 
  
    
      
        ⋖
      
    
    {\displaystyle \lessdot }
  
 to the terminal most recently popped
    else error()
end

== Precedence functions ==
An operator precedence parser usually does not store the precedence table with the relations, which can get rather large. Instead, precedence functions f and g are defined. They map terminal symbols to integers, and so the precedence relations between the symbols are implemented by numerical comparison: $f(a) < g(b)$ must hold if $a \lessdot b$ holds, etc.

Not every table of precedence relations has precedence functions, but in practice for most grammars such functions can be designed.

=== Algorithm for constructing precedence functions ===
The below algorithm is from Aho et al.:

1. Create symbols f_{a} and g_{a} for each grammar terminal a and for the end of string symbol;
2. Partition the created symbols in groups so that f_{a} and g_{b} are in the same group if $a \doteq b$ (there can be symbols in the same group even if their terminals are not connected by this relation);
3. Create a directed graph whose nodes are the groups. For each pair $(a,b)$ of terminals do: place an edge from the group of g_{b} to the group of f_{a} if $a \lessdot b$, otherwise if $a \gtrdot b$ place an edge from the group of f_{a} to that of g_{b};
4. If the constructed graph has a cycle then no precedence functions exist. When there are no cycles, let $f(a)$ be the length of the longest path from the group of f_{a} and let $g(a)$ be the length of the longest path from the group of g_{a}.

=== Example ===
Consider the following table (repeated from above):

$$\begin{array}{c|cccc}
& \mathrm{id}
& +
& *
& \$
\\
\hline
\mathrm{id}
&
& \gtrdot
& \gtrdot
& \gtrdot
\\
+
& \lessdot
& \gtrdot
& \lessdot
& \gtrdot
\\
*
& \lessdot
& \gtrdot
& \gtrdot
& \gtrdot
\\
\$
& \lessdot
& \lessdot
& \lessdot
&
\end{array}$$

Using the algorithm leads to the following graph:

    gid
      \
 fid   f*
    \  /
     g*
    /
  f+  
   | \
   |  g+
   |  |
  g$  f$

from which we extract the following precedence functions from the maximum heights in the directed acyclic graph:

	id	+	*	$
f	4	2	4	0
g	5	1	3	0

== Operator-precedence languages ==
The class of languages described by operator-precedence grammars, i.e., operator-precedence languages, is strictly contained in the class of deterministic context-free languages, and strictly contains visibly pushdown languages.

Operator-precedence languages enjoy many closure properties: union, intersection, complementation, concatenation, and they are the largest known class closed under all these operations and for which the emptiness problem is decidable. Another peculiar feature of operator-precedence languages is their local parsability, that enables efficient parallel parsing.

There are also characterizations based on an equivalent form of automata and monadic second-order logic.
