= Pumping lemma =

In the theory of formal languages, the pumping lemma may refer to:

- Pumping lemma for regular languages, the fact that all sufficiently long strings in such a language have a substring that can be repeated arbitrarily many times, usually used to prove that certain languages are not regular
- Pumping lemma for context-free languages, the fact that all sufficiently long strings in such a language have a pair of substrings that can be repeated arbitrarily many times, usually used to prove that certain languages are not context-free
- Pumping lemma for indexed languages
- Pumping lemma for regular tree languages

== See also ==
- Ogden's lemma, a stronger version of the pumping lemma for context-free languages
