= Yehoshua Bar-Hillel =

Israeli philosopher, mathematician, and linguist

- יהושע בר-הלל
- Born: September 8, 1915; Vienna, Austria-Hungary
- Died: September 25, 1975 (aged 60); Jerusalem, Israel
- Education: Hebrew University of Jerusalem
- Known for: Bar-Hillel lemma
- Children: Maya, Mira
- Scientific career
- Fields: philosophy, mathematics, linguistics
- Institutions: MIT; Hebrew University of Jerusalem
- Thesis: Theory of syntactic categories (1945)
- Doctoral advisor: Abraham Fraenkel
- Other academic advisors: Rudolf Carnap

Yehoshua Bar-Hillel (Hebrew: יהושע בר-הלל; 8 September 1915 – 25 September 1975) was an Israeli philosopher, mathematician, and linguist. He was a pioneer in the fields of machine translation and formal linguistics.

== Early life and education ==
Born Oscar Westreich in Vienna, Austria-Hungary, he was raised in Berlin. In 1933 he emigrated to Palestine with the Bnei Akiva youth movement, and briefly joined the kibbutz Tirat Zvi before settling in Jerusalem and marrying Shulamith.

During World War II, he served in the Jewish Brigade of the British Army. He fought with the Haganah during the 1948 Arab–Israeli War, losing an eye.

Bar-Hillel received his PhD in Philosophy from the Hebrew University where he also studied mathematics under Abraham Fraenkel, with whom he eventually coauthored Foundations of Set Theory (1958, 1973).

== Career ==
Bar-Hillel was a major disciple of Rudolf Carnap, whose Logical Syntax of Language much influenced him. He began a correspondence with Carnap in the 1940s, which led to a 1950 post-doctorate under Carnap at the University of Chicago, and to his collaborating on Carnap's 1952 An Outline of the Theory of Semantic Information.

Bar-Hillel then took up a position at MIT, where he was the first academic to work full-time in the field of machine translation. Bar-Hillel organised the first International Conference on Machine Translation in 1952. Later he expressed doubts that general-purpose fully automatic high-quality machine translation would ever be feasible. He was also a pioneer in the field of information retrieval.

In 1953, Bar-Hillel joined the philosophy department at the Hebrew University, where he taught until his death at age 60. His teachings and writings strongly influenced an entire generation of Israeli philosophers and linguists, including Asa Kasher and Avishai Margalit. In 1953, he founded a pioneering algebraic-computational linguistic group, and in 1961 he contributed to the proof of the pumping lemma for context-free languages (sometimes called the Bar-Hillel lemma). Bar-Hillel helped found the Hebrew University's department of Philosophy of Science. From 1966 to 1969 Bar-Hillel presided over the Division for Logic, Methodology and Philosophy of Science of the International Union of History and Philosophy of Science.

Bar-Hillel's daughter Maya Bar-Hillel is a cognitive psychologist at the Hebrew University, known for her collaborations with Amos Tversky and for her role in critiquing Bible code study. His other daughter, Mira Bar-Hillel, is a freelance journalist who has worked for the London Evening Standard. His granddaughter, Gili Bar-Hillel, is the Hebrew translator of the Harry Potter series of books.

== Select bibliography ==
- Yehoshua Bar-Hillel (1953). "Some Linguistic Problems Connected With Machine Translation" (PDF). Philosophy of Science. 20 (3): 217–225. doi:10.1086/287266. S2CID 62000879. Archived from the original (PDF) on 2018-07-21.
- Husserl's conception of a purely logical grammar (1957), Philosophy and phenomenological research, vol. XVII, number III, March 1957.
- Yehoshua Bar-Hillel (Jul 1954). "Indexical Expressions". Mind. 63 (251): 359–379.
- Report on the state of machine translation in the United States and Great Britain (1959)
- Yehoshua Bar-Hillel (Jan 1963). Four lectures on Algebraic Linguistics and Machine Translation (PDF) (ASTIA Report). Hebrew University, Jerusalem. Archived from the original (PDF) on May 13, 2014.
- Yehoshua Bar-Hillel (1964). Language and Information: Selected Essays on Their Theory and Application. Reading, MA: Addison-Wesley.
- Yehoshua Bar-Hillel, ed. (1965). Logic, Methodology and Philosophy of Science: Proceedings of the 1964 International Congress. Amsterdam: North-Holland.
- Yehoshua Bar-Hillel (1970). Aspects of Language: Essays in Philosophy of Language, Linguistic Philosophy, and Methodology of Linguistics. Amsterdam: North-Holland.
- Yehoshua Bar-Hillel, ed. (Aug 1970). Mathematical Logic and Foundations of Set Theory: Colloquium Proceedings, Jerusalem, 1968. Study in Logic and Foundation of Mathematics. Amsterdam: North-Holland Pub. Co. ISBN 9780720422559.
- Argumentation in pragmatic languages (1970)
- Yehoshua Bar-Hillel, ed. (1971). Pragmatics of Natural Languages: Proceedings of the 1970 International Working Symposium. Synthese Library. Vol. 41. Dordrecht: D. Reidel Publishing Co. doi:10.1007/978-94-010-1713-8. ISBN 978-90-277-0599-0.
- Abraham Halevi Fraenkel; Yehoshua Bar-Hillel; Azriel Levy (1973). Foundations of Set Theory. Studies in Logic and the Foundations of Mathematics. Vol. 67 (2nd ed.). Elsevier. ISBN 9780080887050.

== See also ==
- Categorial grammar
- Indexical expression

== Notes ==
1. Melby, Alan. The Possibility of Language (Amsterdam:Benjamins, 1995, 27-41)
2. Appendix III of 'The present status of automatic translation of languages', Advances in Computers, vol.1 (1960), p.158-163. Reprinted in Y.Bar-Hillel: Language and information (Reading, Mass.: Addison-Wesley, 1964), p.174-179.
