= Amy Greenwald =

American computer scientist

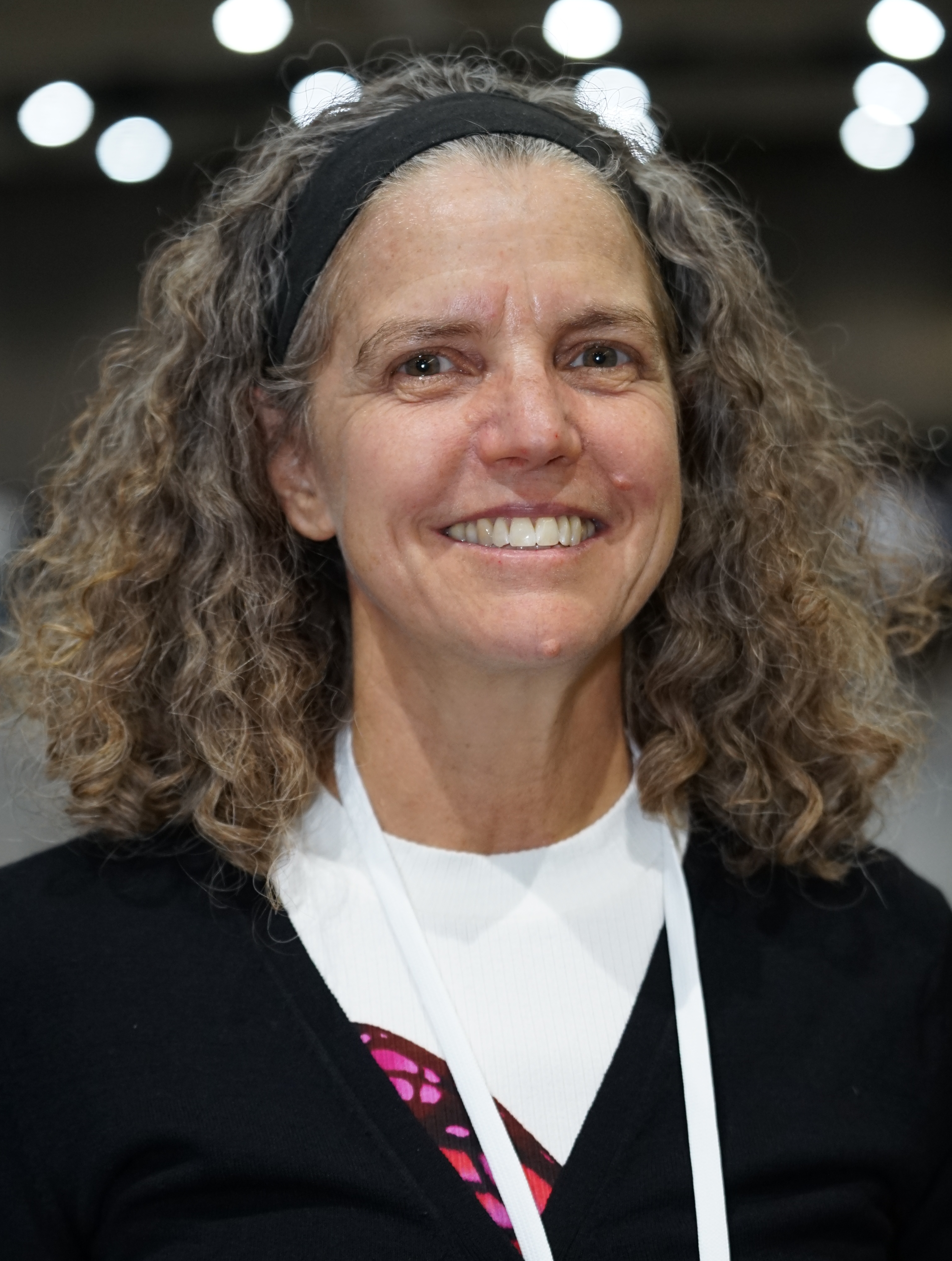
- Greenwald in 2025
- Employer: Brown University
- Awards: NSF CAREER; Presidential Early Career Award for Scientists and Engineers

Academic background
- Education: University of Pennsylvania; University of Oxford; New York University
- Thesis: Learning to Play Network Games (1999)
- Doctoral advisor: Bud Mishra; Rohit Parikh

Academic work
- Discipline: Computer science
- Website: cs.brown.edu/people/faculty/amy/

Amy Rachel Greenwald is an American computer scientist, and a full professor of computer science at Brown University. She lists her research interests as "artificial intelligence, multi-agent systems, reinforcement learning, and algorithmic game theory"; she has also received media attention for her research on computer play of poker.

== Education and career ==
Greenwald received two bachelor's degrees, one in computer science and another in economics, from the University of Pennsylvania, graduating summa cum laude in 1991. She went to the University of Oxford as a Thouron Scholar, and received a master's degree in computation there in 1992. Returning to the US, she received a second master's degree in computer science in 1995 at Cornell University before completing her Ph.D. in computer science at New York University in 1999. Her doctoral dissertation, Learning to Play Network Games, was jointly supervised by Bud Mishra and Rohit Parikh.

After a year of postdoctoral research at the IBM Thomas J. Watson Research Center, Greenwald became an assistant professor at Brown University in 2000. She was promoted to associate professor in 2008 and full professor in 2018.

== Book ==
Greenwald is a coauthor of the book Autonomous Bidding Agents: Strategies and Lessons from the Trading Agent Competition (with Michael P. Wellman and Peter Stone, MIT Press, 2007).

== Recognition ==
Greenwald received the National Science Foundation CAREER Award in 2002. In the same year, she received the Presidential Early Career Award for Scientists and Engineers, "for advancing a theory about how automated software agents can make decisions in uncertain environments such as online auctions". She received the Alfred P. Sloan Research Fellowship in 2006.

Several students coached by Greenwald have medaled in the Supply Chain Management League of the International Automated Negotiation Agents Competition, in 2019, 2021, and 2024.
