= Laxmi Parida =

IBM Master Inventor

- Born: Odia: ଲକ୍ଷ୍ମୀ ପରିଡ଼ା Odisha, India
- Education: New York University (PhD)
- Awards: ISCB Fellow (2020); IBM Fellow (2019); IBM Master Inventor (2019)
- Scientific career
- Fields: Computational genomics Population genomics Bioinformatics; Cancer Genomics; Topological data analysis
- Workplaces: IBM Research; New York University; Thomas J. Watson Research Center; Courant Institute of Mathematical Sciences
- Thesis: Algorithmic techniques in Computational Genomics (1998)
- Doctoral advisor: Bud Mishra; Rohit Parikh
- Website: researcher.ibm.com/person/us-parida

Laxmi Parida is an IBM Master Inventor and group leader in computational genomics at the Thomas J. Watson Research Center and Courant Institute of Mathematical Sciences in New York.

== Education ==
Parida was educated at New York University (NYU) where she was awarded a PhD in 1998 for research on algorithms for computational genomics supervised by Bud Mishra.

== Research and career ==
Parida's research interests are in computational genomics, population genomics, bioinformatics, cancer genomics, topological data analysis and their applications to coronavirus disease 2019.

=== Awards and honors ===
Parida was awarded Fellowship of the ISCB in 2020 for outstanding contributions to computational biology and bioinformatics. She was also awarded an IBM Fellowship and IBM Master Inventor status in 2019. She is a member of the Association for Computing Machinery (ACM) and the Society for Industrial and Applied Mathematics (SIAM).
