= Pumping lemma for context-free languages =

Type of pumping lemma

In computer science, in particular in formal language theory, the pumping lemma for context-free languages, also known as the Bar-Hillel lemma, is a lemma that gives a property shared by all context-free languages and generalizes the pumping lemma for regular languages.

The pumping lemma can be used to construct a refutation by contradiction that a specific language is not context-free. Conversely, the pumping lemma does not suffice to guarantee that a language is context-free; there are other necessary conditions, such as Ogden's lemma, or the Interchange lemma.

== Formal statement ==
Proof idea: If $s$ is sufficiently long, its derivation tree w.r.t. a Chomsky normal form grammar must contain some nonterminal $N$ twice on some tree path (upper picture). Repeating $n$ times the derivation part $N$ ⇒...⇒ $vNx$ obtains a derivation for $uv^n wx^n y$ (lower left and right picture for $n=0$ and $2$, respectively).

If a language $L$ is context-free, then there exists some integer $p \geq 1$ (called a "pumping length") such that every string $s$ in $L$ that has a length of $p$ or more symbols (i.e. with $|s| \geq p$) can be written as

$$s = uvwxy$$

with substrings $u, v, w, x$ and $y$, such that

1. $|vx| \geq 1$,
2. $|vwx| \leq p$, and
3. $uv^n wx^n y \in L$ for all $n \geq 0$.

Below is a formal expression of the Pumping Lemma.

$$\begin{array}{l}
(\forall  L\subseteq \Sigma^*)  \\
\quad      (\mbox{context free}(L) \Rightarrow \\
\quad      ((\exists p\geq 1) ((\forall s\in L) ((|s|\geq p) \Rightarrow \\
\quad ((\exists u,v,w,x,y \in \Sigma^*) (s=uvwxy \land |vx|\geq 1 \land |vwx|\leq p \land (\forall n \geq 0)
(uv^nwx^ny\in L)))))))
\end{array}$$

== Informal statement and explanation ==
The pumping lemma for context-free languages (called just "the pumping lemma" for the rest of this article) describes a property that all context-free languages are guaranteed to have.

The property holds for all strings in the language that are of length at least $p$, where $p$ is a constant—called the pumping length—that varies between context-free languages.

Say $s$ is a string of length at least $p$ that is in the language.

The pumping lemma states that $s$ can be split into five substrings, $s = uvwxy$, where $vx$ is non-empty and the length of $vwx$ is at most $p$, such that repeating $v$ and $x$ the same number of times ($n$) in $s$ produces a string that is still in the language. It is often useful to repeat zero times, which removes $v$ and $x$ from the string (this is "pumping down"). This process of "pumping up" $s$ with additional copies of $v$ and $x$ is what gives the pumping lemma its name.

Finite languages (which are regular and hence context-free) obey the pumping lemma trivially by having $p$ equal to the maximum string length in $L$ plus one. As there are no strings of this length the pumping lemma holds vacuously.

== Usage of the lemma ==
The pumping lemma is often used to prove that a given language L is non-context-free, by showing that arbitrarily long strings s are in L that cannot be "pumped" without producing strings outside L.

For example, if $S\subset \N$ is infinite but does not contain an (infinite) arithmetic progression, then $L = \{a^{n} : n\in S\}$ is not context-free. In particular, neither the prime numbers nor the square numbers are context-free.

For example, the language $L = \{ a^n b^n c^n | n > 0 \}$ can be shown to be non-context-free by using the pumping lemma in a proof by contradiction. First, assume that L is context free. By the pumping lemma, there exists an integer p which is the pumping length of language L. Consider the string $s = a^p b^p c^p$ in L. The pumping lemma tells us that s can be written in the form $s = uvwxy$, where u, v, w, x, and y are substrings, such that $|vx| \geq 1$, $|vwx| \leq p$, and $uv^i wx^i y \in L$ for every integer $i \geq 0$. By the choice of s and the fact that $|vwx| \leq p$, it is easily seen that the substring vwx can contain no more than two distinct symbols. That is, we have one of five possibilities for vwx:

1. $vwx = a^j$ for some $j \leq p$.
2. $vwx = a^j b^k$ for some j and k with $j+k \leq p$
3. $vwx = b^j$ for some $j \leq p$.
4. $vwx = b^j c^k$ for some j and k with $j+k \leq p$.
5. $vwx = c^j$ for some $j \leq p$.

In each case, $uv^i wx^i y$ does not contain equal numbers of each letter for any $i \neq 1$. Thus, $uv^2 wx^2 y$ does not have the form $a^i b^i c^i$. This contradicts the definition of L. Therefore, our initial assumption that L is context free must be false.

In 1960, Scheinberg proved that $L = \{ a^n b^n a^n | n > 0 \}$ is not context-free using a precursor of the pumping lemma.

While the pumping lemma is often a useful tool to prove that a given language is not context-free, there are languages that are not context-free, but still satisfy the condition given by the pumping lemma, for example
$$L = \{ b^j c^k d^l | j, k, l \in \mathbb{N} \} \cup \{ a^i b^j c^j d^j | i, j \in \mathbb{N}, i \ge 1\}$$
For $s = b^j c^k d^l$ with e.g. $j \ge 1$, choose $vwx$ to consist only of $b$'s, for $a^ib^jc^jd^j$, choose $vwx$ to consist only of $a$'s. In both cases all pumped strings are still in $L$.

To prove that a given language is context-free, it is sufficient to construct a pushdown automaton that accepts it.
