= Alessandra Carbone =

Italian mathematician and computer scientist

- Education: CUNY Graduate Center
- Occupations: Mathematician and computer scientist
- Known for: Muscular dystrophy research

Alessandra Carbone is an Italian mathematician and computer scientist. She is a professor in the computer science department of the Pierre and Marie Curie University. Since 2009 she has headed the laboratory of computational and quantitative biology.

== Career ==
She gained her PhD in mathematics in 1993 at the Graduate Center of the City University of New York, supervised by Rohit Jivanlal Parikh, after which she took up a post doctoral post at the Paris Diderot University until 1995 when she took a position at the Technical University of Vienna until 1996. She has taught computer science at the Paris 12 Val de Marne University and the Institut des Hautes Études Scientifiques. She is currently a professor at Sorbonne University, previously known as Pierre and Marie Curie University

== Recognition ==
Carbone is a senior member of the Institut Universitaire de France and received the Irène Joliot-Curie Prize in 2010. She is also a recipient in 2012 of the Grammaticakis-Neumann Prize and the Legion of Honour in 2014.
