= Bhubaneswar Mishra =

Indian American mathematician

Bud Mishra
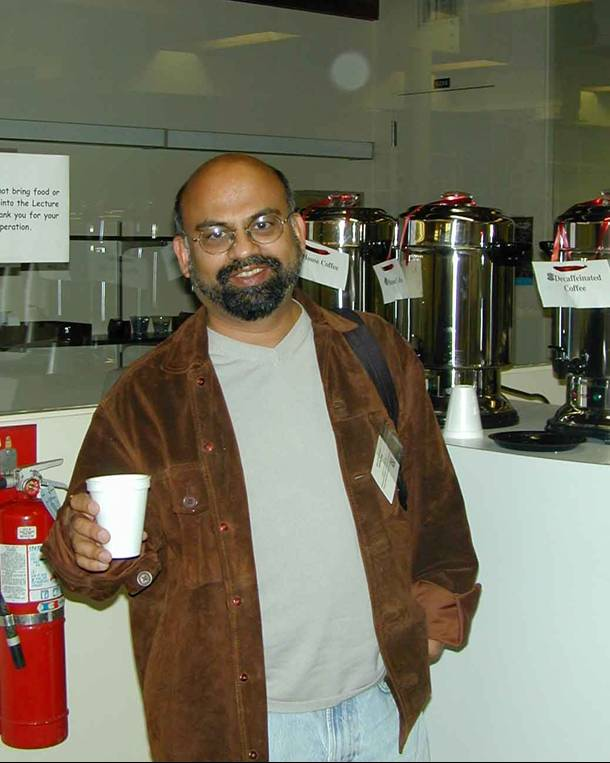
- Bhubaneswar Mishra (Bud Mishra) poses in front of his lab at the Courant Institute for Mathematics at New York University.
- Born: Bhubaneswar Mishra; Bhubaneswar, India
- Citizenship: United States
- Education: Indian Institute of Technology Kharagpur; Carnegie Mellon University
- Awards: American Association for the Advancement of Science Fellow (2010)
- Scientific career
- Fields: Computer Science
- Workplaces: New York University
- Doctoral advisor: Edmund M. Clarke
- Doctoral students: Amy Greenwald; Laxmi Parida

Bhubaneswar Mishra is an Indian American computer scientist and professor at the Courant Institute of Mathematical Sciences of New York University. He is known for his applied contributions to bioinformatics, cybersecurity, and computational finance. Mishra is listed as an ISI highly cited researcher in Computer Science.

== Career ==
Born in Bhubaneswar, India, Mishra received a B.Tech. degree in Electronics and Electrical Engineering from the Indian Institute of Technology Kharagpur in 1980. He then received M.S. and Ph.D. degrees in Computer Science from Carnegie Mellon University in 1982 and 1985, respectively. His Ph.D. thesis advisor was Edmund M. Clarke. He began his scientific career as an instructor at the Courant Institute of Mathematical Sciences. He is also a visiting scholar at the Cold Spring Harbor Laboratory, as well as a co-founder in OpGen, a computational biology company. He also maintains a position as principal investigator at the Center for Malicious Behavior and Model Checking.

== Awards and honors ==
Mishra is a fellow of the Association for Computing Machinery (2007), of the IEEE (2009), and of the American Association for the Advancement of Science (2010).
