= Rohit Jivanlal Parikh =

Indian-American mathematician

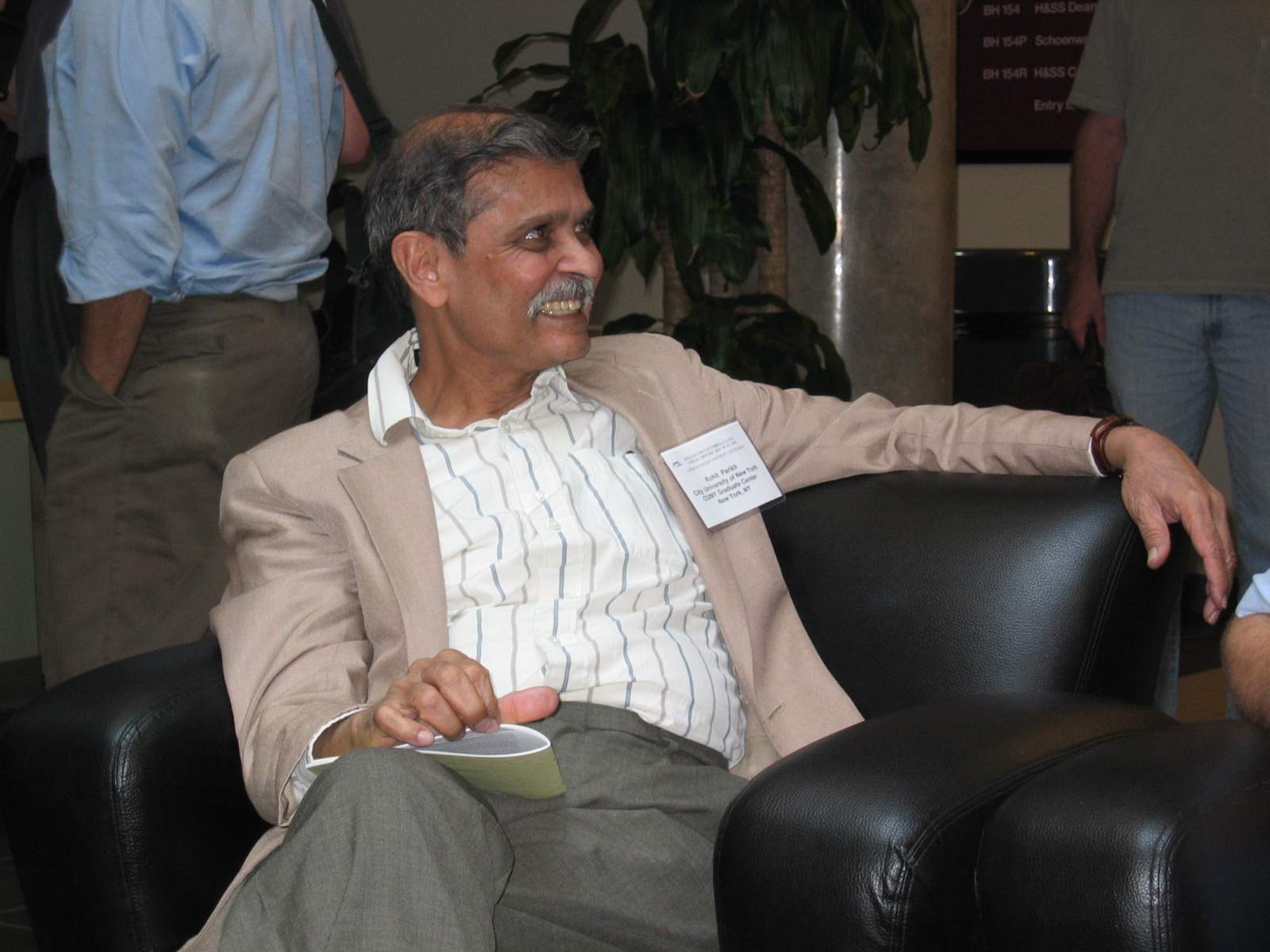
- Parikh in 2004
- Education: Harvard University, PhD Mathematics, 1962; Harvard College, AB with highest honors in Physics, 1957
- Known for: Work on recursion theory, proof theory, non-standard analysis, ultrafinitism, dynamic logic, logic of knowledge, philosophical logic, social software, Parikh's theorem
- Spouse: Carol Parikh
- Children: Two (Vikram and Uma)
- Awards: William Lowell Putnam Mathematical Competition Prize Winner, 1955, 1956, 1957; William Lowell Putnam Fellow 1957;
- Scientific career
- Fields: Mathematics, logic, philosophy, computer sciences, economics
- Workplaces: Brooklyn College; CUNY Graduate Center
- Doctoral advisor: Hartley Rogers, Jr; Burton Dreben
- Doctoral students: Amy Greenwald; Alessandra Carbone; David Ellerman; Laxmi Parida

Rohit Jivanlal Parikh is an Indian-American mathematician, logician, computer scientist and philosopher known for his contributions to mathematical logic, recursion theory, proof theory, epistemic logic, game theory, formal languages, and social software. He has been a Distinguished Professor at Brooklyn College at the City University of New York (CUNY) (1982-2023).

== Early life and education ==
He completed his undergraduate studies at Harvard College, graduating magna cum laude with honors in physics in 1957. He earned his Ph.D. in mathematics from Harvard University in 1962 under the supervision of Hartley Rogers Jr and Burton Dreben.

Parikh was selected as a Fellow of Harvard University.

== Academic career ==
Parikh served on the faculty of Boston University from 1967 to 1982 before joining the City University of New York (CUNY), where he was appointed Distinguished Professor in 1982. He held this title until 2023.

Parikh has been affiliated with the fields of computer science, mathematics, and philosophy. Earlier in his career he taught at Panjab University in India during 1964–1965. His academic appointments include visiting and research positions at Stanford University, Massachusetts Institute of Technology (MIT) Laboratory for Computer Science, Courant Institute of Mathematical Sciences at New York University, ETH Zurich, Tata Institute of Fundamental Research, SUNY Buffalo, Panjab University, and Bristol University.

Parikh is also one of the founders of the Indian Conference on Logic and Applications (ICLA).

== Research ==
Parikh’s early work made contributions to recursion theory, proof theory, and formal languages. He is particularly known in theoretical computer science for work related to Parikh’s theorem, which concerns the commutative image of context-free languages and their semi-linear sets. His interests expanded over time to include non-standard analysis, logic of programs, epistemic logic (logic of knowledge), belief revision, and game theory. Parikh is also recognized for advancing the interdisciplinary field of “social software,” which applies logical, computational, and game-theoretic techniques to analyze social procedures and algorithms such as elections, communication protocols, and decision-making systems.

== Personal life and politics ==
Rohit Parikh was married from 1968 to 1994 to Carol Parikh (née Geris), who is best known for her stories and biography of Oscar Zariski, The Unreal Life of Oscar Zariski.

Parikh is a nontheist opposing abortions. To fight abortions he joined the Atheist and Agnostic Pro-Life League.

== Awards and recognition ==
- Gibbs Prize, Bombay University, 1954
- William Lowell Putnam Mathematical Competition Prize Winner, 1955, 1956, 1957

== Publications ==
- — (January 15, 1961). "Language-Generating Devices". Quarterly Progress Report (60). Cambridge, Massachusetts: Research Laboratory of Electronics, Massachusetts Institute of Technology: 199–212.
- — (1966). "On Context-Free Languages". Journal of the ACM. 13 (4): 570–581. doi:10.1145/321356.321364. S2CID 12263468.
- — (1971). "Existence and Feasibility in Arithmetic". Journal of Symbolic Logic. 36: 494–508.
- Parnes, M.; — (1972). "Conditional Probability can be Defined for Arbitrary Pairs of Sets of Reals". Advances in Mathematics. 9: 520–522.
- — (1973). "On the Length of Proofs". Transactions of the American Mathematical Society. 177: 29–36.
- de Jongh, D.H.J.; — (1977). "Well Partial Orderings and Hierarchies". Proc. Kon. Ned. Akad. Sci, Series A. 80: 195–207.
- Kozen, D.; — (1981). "An Elementary Completeness Proof for PDL". Theoretical Computer Science. 14: 113–118.
- — (1982). "The Problem of Vague Predicates". In Cohen, R.S; Wartofsky, M.W. (eds.). Language, Logic and Method. Boston Studies in the Philosophy of Science. Vol. 31. Dordrecht: Springer. pp. 241–261. doi:10.1007/978-94-009-7702-0_13.
