= Context-free language =

Formal language generated by context-free grammar

In formal language theory, a context-free language (CFL), also called a Chomsky type-2 language, is a language generated by a context-free grammar (CFG).

Context-free languages have many applications in programming languages, in particular, most arithmetic expressions are generated by context-free grammars.

== Background ==
=== Context-free grammar ===
Different context-free grammars can generate the same context-free language. Intrinsic properties of the language can be distinguished from extrinsic properties of a particular grammar by comparing multiple grammars that describe the language.

=== Automata ===
The set of all context-free languages is identical to the set of languages accepted by pushdown automata, which makes these languages amenable to parsing. Further, for a given CFG, there is a direct way to produce a pushdown automaton for the grammar (and thereby the corresponding language), though going the other way (producing a grammar given an automaton) is not as direct.

== Examples ==
An example context-free language is $L = \{a^nb^n:n\geq1\}$, the language of all non-empty even-length strings, the entire first halves of which are a's, and the entire second halves of which are b's. L is generated by the grammar $S\to aSb ~|~ ab$. This language is not regular. It is accepted by the pushdown automaton $M=(\{q_0,q_1,q_f\}, \{a,b\}, \{a,z\}, \delta, q_0, z, \{q_f\})$ where $\delta$ is defined as follows: (Note: meaning of $\delta$'s arguments and results: $\delta(\mathrm{state}_1, \mathrm{read}, \mathrm{pop}) = (\mathrm{state}_2, \mathrm{push})$)

$$\begin{align}
\delta(q_0, a, z) &= (q_0, az) \\
\delta(q_0, a, a) &= (q_0, aa) \\
\delta(q_0, b, a) &= (q_1, \varepsilon) \\
\delta(q_1, b, a) &= (q_1, \varepsilon) \\
\delta(q_1, \varepsilon, z) &= (q_f, \varepsilon)
\end{align}$$

Unambiguous CFLs are a proper subset of all CFLs: there are inherently ambiguous CFLs. An example of an inherently ambiguous CFL is the union of $\{a^n b^m c^m d^n | n, m > 0\}$ with $\{a^n b^n c^m d^m | n, m > 0\}$. This set is context-free, since the union of two context-free languages is always context-free. But there is no way to unambiguously parse strings in the (non-context-free) subset $\{a^n b^n c^n d^n | n > 0\}$ which is the intersection of these two languages.

=== Dyck language ===
The language of all properly matched parentheses is generated by the grammar $S\to SS ~|~ (S) ~|~ \varepsilon$.

== Properties ==
=== Context-free parsing ===
The context-free nature of the language makes it simple to parse with a pushdown automaton.

Determining an instance of the membership problem; i.e. given a string $w$, determine whether $w \in L(G)$ where $L$ is the language generated by a given grammar $G$; is also known as recognition. Context-free recognition for Chomsky normal form grammars was shown by Leslie G. Valiant to be reducible to Boolean matrix multiplication, thus inheriting its complexity upper bound of O(n^{2.3728596}). (Note: In Valiant's paper, O(n^{2.81}) was the then-best known upper bound. See Matrix multiplication#Computational complexity for bound improvements since then.) Conversely, Lillian Lee has shown O(n^{3−ε}) Boolean matrix multiplication to be reducible to O(n^{3−3ε}) CFG parsing, thus establishing some kind of lower bound for the latter.

Practical uses of context-free languages require also to produce a derivation tree that exhibits the structure that the grammar associates with the given string. The process of producing this tree is called parsing. Known parsers have a time complexity that is cubic in the size of the string that is parsed.

Formally, the set of all context-free languages is identical to the set of languages accepted by pushdown automata (PDA). Parser algorithms for context-free languages include the CYK algorithm and Earley's Algorithm.

A special subclass of context-free languages are the deterministic context-free languages which are defined as the set of languages accepted by a deterministic pushdown automaton and can be parsed by a LR(k) parser.

See also parsing expression grammar as an alternative approach to grammar and parser.

=== Closure properties ===
The class of context-free languages is closed under the following operations. That is, if L and P are context-free languages, the following languages are context-free as well:

- the union $L \cup P$ of L and P
- the reversal of L
- the concatenation $L \cdot P$ of L and P
- the Kleene star $L^*$ of L
- the image $\varphi(L)$ of L under a homomorphism $\varphi$
- the image $\varphi^{-1}(L)$ of L under an inverse homomorphism $\varphi^{-1}$
- the circular shift of L (the language $\{vu : uv \in L \}$)
- the prefix closure of L (the set of all prefixes of strings from L)
- the quotient L/R of L by a regular language R

==== Nonclosure under intersection, complement, and difference ====
The context-free languages are not closed under intersection. This can be seen by taking the languages $A = \{a^n b^n c^m \mid m, n \geq 0 \}$ and $B = \{a^m b^n c^n \mid m,n \geq 0\}$, which are both context-free. (Note: A context-free grammar for the language A is given by the following production rules, taking S as the start symbol: S → Sc | aTb | ε; T → aTb | ε. The grammar for B is analogous.) Their intersection is $A \cap B = \{ a^n b^n c^n \mid n \geq 0\}$, which can be shown to be non-context-free by the pumping lemma for context-free languages. As a consequence, context-free languages cannot be closed under complementation, as for any languages A and B, their intersection can be expressed by union and complement: $A \cap B = \overline{\overline{A} \cup \overline{B}}$. In particular, context-free language cannot be closed under difference, since complement can be expressed by difference: $\overline{L} = \Sigma^* \setminus L$.

However, if L is a context-free language and D is a regular language then both their intersection $L\cap D$ and their difference $L\setminus D$ are context-free languages.

=== Decidability ===
In formal language theory, questions about regular languages are usually decidable, but ones about context-free languages are often not. It is decidable whether such a language is finite, but not whether it contains every possible string, is regular, is unambiguous, or is equivalent to a language with a different grammar.

The following problems are undecidable for arbitrarily given context-free grammars A and B:

- Equivalence: is $L(A)=L(B)$?
- Disjointness: is $L(A) \cap L(B) = \emptyset$ ? However, the intersection of a context-free language and a regular language is context-free, hence the variant of the problem where B is a regular grammar is decidable (see "Emptiness" below).
- Containment: is $L(A) \subseteq L(B)$ ? Again, the variant of the problem where B is a regular grammar is decidable, while that where A is regular is generally not.
- Universality: is $L(A)=\Sigma^*$?
- Regularity: is $L(A)$ a regular language?
- Ambiguity: is every grammar for $L(A)$ ambiguous?

The following problems are decidable for arbitrary context-free languages:

- Emptiness: Given a context-free grammar A, is $L(A) = \emptyset$ ?
- Finiteness: Given a context-free grammar A, is $L(A)$ finite?
- Membership: Given a context-free grammar G, and a word $w$, does $w \in L(G)$ ? Efficient polynomial-time algorithms for the membership problem are the CYK algorithm and Earley's Algorithm.

According to Hopcroft, Motwani, Ullman (2006), many of the fundamental closure and (un)decidability properties of context-free languages were shown in the 1961 paper of Bar-Hillel, Perles, and Shamir.

=== Languages that are not context-free ===
The set $\{a^n b^n c^n d^n | n > 0\}$ is a context-sensitive language, but there does not exist a context-free grammar generating this language. So there exist context-sensitive languages which are not context-free. To prove that a given language is not context-free, one may employ the pumping lemma for context-free languages or a number of other methods, such as Ogden's lemma or Parikh's theorem.
