= Lillian Lee (computer scientist) =

American computer scientist

- Education: Harvard University
- Awards: AAAI Fellow (2013); ACL Fellow (2017); ACM Fellow (2018)
- Scientific career
- Workplaces: Cornell
- Thesis: Similarity-Based Approaches to Natural Language Processing (1997)
- Doctoral advisor: Stuart M. Shieber

Lillian Lee is a computer scientist whose research involves natural language processing, sentiment analysis, and computational social science. She is a professor of computer science and information science at Cornell University, and co-editor-in-chief of the journal Transactions of the Association for Computational Linguistics.

== Education ==
Lee graduated from Cornell University in 1993 with an undergraduate degree in math and science. She completed her Ph.D. at Harvard University in 1997. Her dissertation, Similarity-Based Approaches to Natural Language Processing, was supervised by Stuart M. Shieber.

== Career ==
Lee has been a member of the Cornell faculty since 1997.

== Recognition ==
Lee has been a fellow of the Association for the Advancement of Artificial Intelligence since 2013, and of the Association for Computational Linguistics since 2017. Lee was elected as an ACM Fellow in 2018 for "contributions to natural language processing, sentiment analysis, and computational social science".
