= SDSI =

- Simple public-key infrastructure
- EPA Safer Detergents Stewardship Initiative (SDSI)
