= CBCL =

CBCL may refer to:

- CBCL-FM, a radio station (93.5 FM) licensed to London, Ontario, Canada
- Common Business Communication Language
- Child Behavior Checklist, a multiple informant measure of child emotional and behavioral adjustment
- CBCL (MIT), the Center for Biological and Computational Learning at MIT
