= MLisp =

Programming language

"MLisp" is also another name for Mocklisp, a stripped-down version of Lisp used as an extension language in Gosling Emacs.

MLISP is a variant of Lisp with an Algol-like syntax based on M-Expressions, which were the function syntax in the original description of Lisp by John McCarthy. McCarthy's M-expressions were never implemented in an exact form.

MLISP was first implemented for the IBM 360 by Horace Enea and then reimplemented for the PDP 10 by David Canfield Smith. This second implementation also supported a special kind of lambdas ("FEXPR"), which do not evaluate their arguments. As in Lisp-1 or Scheme, there was a single namespace for variables and functions.

While MLISP was just a preprocessor with an alternative, more reader-friendly syntax for Lisp, the descendant MLISP 2 introduced new concepts:

- interactive interpretation of programs instead of compilation
- extensibility with a syntax description language (see hygienic macros)
- pattern matching
- backtracking by the use of closures on a stack and indices for continuations

MLISP2 was called a transitional language by the authors. Larry Tesler improved the pattern matching system to implement a successor language called LISP70, which was only completed to a preliminary version. Though this path of LISP evolution is widely neglected, it resembles some features, later found in ML or Scheme.

M-LISP (MetaLISP) by Robert Muller is an unrelated language from 1989–1992. It was "a hybrid of M-expression LISP and Scheme".

== See also ==
There have been multiple implementations of infix-notation Lisps and Lisp-like or Lisp-derived languages. Some notable examples include:

- Dylan, which originated in Apple's Newton project
- CGOL
