= Shunting yard =

Shunting yard may refer to:

- Classification yard
- Shunting yard algorithm
- British term for rail yard
