= Exp4j =

exp4j
- Stable release: 0.4.3 / 2014-10-10
- Repository: github.com/fasseg/exp4j
- Written in: Java
- Type: Math
- License: Apache License 2.0
- Website: www.objecthunter.net/exp4j/

exp4j is a small Java library for evaluation of mathematical expressions. It implements Dijkstra's Shunting-yard algorithm to translate expressions from infix notation to Reverse Polish notation and calculates the result using a simple Stack algorithm.

== Features ==
- Variables can be used in expressions
- exp4j comes with a set of common built-in functions
- Users can create and use their own custom operators
- Users can create and use their own custom functions

== License terms ==
exp4j is released under the terms of the Apache License 2.0

== Examples of usage ==
Calculating the result of $3 * \frac{\sin{(\pi)} - 2}{e}$ can be done in the following way:

Expression e = new ExpressionBuilder("3 * (sin(pi) - 2 )/ e")
        .variables("pi", "e")
        .build()
        .setVariable("pi", Math.PI)
        .setVariable("e", Math.E);
double result = e.evaluate();

== See also ==
- mXparser - Mathematical Expressions Parser / Evaluator
