= David Magerman =

American computer scientist and philanthropist

David Mitchell Magerman
- Born: 1968 (age 57–58)
- Education: Stanford University, University of Pennsylvania
- Spouse: Debra Magerman (née Kampel)
- Children: 4
- Parent(s): Melvin Magerman and Sheila Magerman
- Website: http://www-cs-students.stanford.edu/~magerman/

David Mitchell Magerman (born 1968) is an American computer scientist and philanthropist. He spent 22 years working for investment management company and hedge fund Renaissance Technologies.

== Early life and education ==
Magerman was born to Melvin and Sheila Magerman. His father owned All-City Taxi in Miami, Florida, and his mother was a secretary for a group of accounting firms in Tamarac.

Magerman attended the University of Pennsylvania, where he received his B.S. degree. He received his Ph.D. in computer science from Stanford University under the supervision of Vaughan Pratt (Natural Language Parsing As Statistical Pattern Recognition.)

== Career ==
Magerman spent two decades working for James Simons’ New York-based investment management company Renaissance Technologies, where he developed trading algorithms. In 2017, Magerman publicly opposed the views of his boss, Robert Mercer, concerning politics and race issues in America. Mercer, the co-CEO of Renaissance Technology, suspended Magerman without pay and later made the suspension permanent. That same year Magerman filed a federal lawsuit against Mercer, seeking an excess of $150,000 in damages over alleged racist comments and unlawful termination.

=== Business ventures ===
In order to maintain the Jewish community in his neighborhood, Magerman has worked on several business ventures. His first of these was Citron and Rose, an upscale kosher certified meat restaurant, with Michael Solomonov as the head chef. After seeing little to no benefit of an upscale dining experience, Magerman re-branded the establishment as C&R Kitchen, and split with head chef Solomonov. During this time, he opened a casual dairy restaurant across the street. To better serve the community, C&R Kitchen was closed and replaced with a more fast casual place, The Dairy Express, known for its high capacity pizza oven. However, both of these restaurants have closed, and Citron & Rose became, C&R the Tavern. Zagafen, a restaurant that was attempted to mimic the non-kosher, ZaVino, was also opened.

== Philanthropy ==
Since founding The Kohelet Foundation in 2009, Magerman has donated tens of millions of dollars to local causes. Some of these include Kohelet Yeshiva High School (renamed from Stern Hebrew High School in the gift's honor), Yeshiva University and the Yeshiva Lab School.

In 2020, Magerman became a financial and vocal supporter of First Generation Investors, a 501(c)(3) nonprofit organization that teaches high school students in underserved communities the power of investing and provides the students with real money to invest. He guest spoke to its students during a virtual webinar in July 2020.

In 2023, Magerman changed the name of The Kohelet Foundation to The Tzemach David Foundation. He did this because he did not want to be mistaken with an NGO with the same name that backed the Israel government’s judicial reform effort.

In 2024, Magerman pledged five million dollars to higher education institutions in Israel. He decided to stop supporting his alma mater, the University of Pennsylvania, over the administration’s handling of protests against Israel on campus that he considered antisemitic after the October 7, 2023 Hamas massacre in Israel.

== Freedom from Facebook ==
Magerman provided the initial funds for the campaign group "Freedom from Facebook", donating $425,000 as of late 2018.

== Personal life ==
Magerman married Debra Magerman (née Kampel), on August 8, 1999. They have four children.
