= SPKAC =

Data format for sending a certificate signing request

SPKAC (Signed Public Key and Challenge, also known as Netscape SPKI) is a format for sending a certificate signing request (CSR): it encodes a public key, that can be manipulated using OpenSSL. It is created using the little documented HTML keygen element inside a number of Netscape compatible browsers.

== Standardisation ==
There exists an ongoing effort to standardise SPKAC through an Internet Draft in the Internet Engineering Task Force (IETF). The purpose of this work has been to formally define what has existed prior as a de facto standard, and to address security deficiencies, particularly with respect to historic insecure use of MD5 that has since been declared unsafe for use with digital signatures.

== Implementations ==
HTML5 originally specified the <keygen> element to support SPKAC in the browser to make it easier to create client side certificates through a web service for protocols such as WebID; however, subsequent work for HTML 5.1 placed the keygen element "at-risk", and the first public working draft of HTML 5.2 removes the keygen element entirely. The removal of the keygen element is due to non-interoperability and non-conformity from a standards perspective in addition to security concerns.

The World Wide Web Consortium (W3C) Web Authentication Working Group developed the WebAuthn (Web Authentication) API to replace the keygen element.

Bouncy Castle provides a Java class.

An implementation for Erlang/OTP exists too.

An implementation for Python is named pyspkac.

PHP OpenSSL extension as of version 5.6.0.

Node.js implementation.

=== Deficiencies ===
The user interface needs to be improved in browsers, to make it more obvious to users when a server is asking for the client certificate.

== See also ==
- Simple public-key infrastructure (SPKI)
