= MXparser =

Mathematics software

mXparser
- Original author: Mariusz Gromada
- Release: January 2010; 16 years ago
- Stable release: 6.1.1 / 17 May 2026; 3 months ago
- Written in: Java, C#, C++
- Platform: JVM, Android, C++, .NET, .NET Core, .NET Standard, Windows Phone, MONO, Xamarin, Xamarin.iOS, Xamarin.Android
- Website: mathparser.org
- Repository: github.com/mariuszgromada/MathParser.org-mXparser/

mXparser is an open-source mathematical expressions parser/evaluator providing abilities to calculate various expressions at a run time. Expressions definitions are given as plain text, then verified in terms of grammar / syntax, finally calculated. Library source code is maintained separately for Java and C#, providing the same API for Java/JVM, Android, .NET and Mono (Common Language Specification Compliant).

== Main features / usage examples ==
mXparser delivers functionalities such as: basic calculations, implied multiplication, built-in constants and functions, numerical calculus operations, iterated operators, user defined constants, user defined functions, user defined recursion, Unicode mathematical symbols support.

=== Basic operators ===
mXparser supports basic operators, such as: addition '+', subtraction '-', multiplication '*', division '/', factorial '!', power '^', modulo '#'.

Expression e = new Expression("2+3/(4+5)^4");
double v = e.calculate();

=== Implied multiplication ===
Expression e = new Expression("2(3+4)3");
double v = e.calculate();

Expression e = new Expression("2pi(3+4)2sin(3)e");
double v = e.calculate();

=== Binary relations ===
It is possible to combine typical expressions with binary relations (such as: greater than '>', less than '<', equality '=', inequality '<>', greater or equal '>=', lower or equal '<='), as each relation evaluation results in either '1' for true outcome, or '0' for false.

Expression e = new Expression("(2<3)+5");
double v = e.calculate();

=== Boolean logic ===
Boolean logic also operates assuming equivalence of '1 as true' and '0 as false'. Supported Boolean operators include: AND conjunction, OR disjunction, NAND Sheffer stroke, NOR, XOR Exclusive OR, IMP Implication, CIMP Converse implication, NIMP Material nonimplication, CNIMP Converse nonimplication, EQV Logical biconditional, Negation.

Expression e = new Expression("1 --> 0");
double v = e.calculate();

=== Built-in mathematical functions ===
Supported common mathematical functions (unary, binary and variable number of arguments), including: trigonometric functions, inverse trigonometric functions, logarithm functions, exponential function, hyperbolic functions, Inverse hyperbolic functions, Bell numbers, Lucas numbers, Stirling numbers, prime-counting function, exponential integral function, logarithmic integral function, offset logarithmic integral, binomial coefficient and others.

Expression e = new Expression("sin(0)+ln(2)+log(3,9)");
double v = e.calculate();

Expression e = new Expression("min(1,2,3,4)+gcd(1000,100,10)");
double v = e.calculate();

Expression e = new Expression("if(2<1, 3, 4)");
double v = e.calculate();

Expression e = new Expression("iff(2<1, 1; 3<4, 2; 10<2, 3; 5<10, 4)");
double v = e.calculate();

=== Built-in math constants ===
Built-in mathematical constants, with high precision.

Expression e = new Expression("sin(pi)+ln(e)");
double v = e.calculate();

=== Iterated operators ===
Iterated summation and product operators.

Expression e = new Expression("sum(i, 1, 10, ln(i))");
double v = e.calculate();

Expression e = new Expression("prod(i, 1, 10, sin(i))");
double v = e.calculate();

=== Numerical differentiation and integration ===
mXparser delivers implementation of the following calculus operations: differentiation and integration.

Expression e = new Expression("der( sin(x), x )");
double v = e.calculate();

Expression e = new Expression("int( sqrt(1-x^2), x, -1, 1)");
double v = e.calculate();

=== Prime numbers support ===
Expression e = new Expression("ispr(21)");
double v = e.calculate();

Expression e = new Expression("Pi(1000)");
double v = e.calculate();

=== Unicode mathematical symbols support ===
Expression e = new Expression("√2");
double v = e.calculate();

Expression e = new Expression("∜16 + ∛27 + √16");
double v = e.calculate();

Expression e = new Expression("∑(i, 1, 5, i^2)");
double v = e.calculate();

== Elements defined by user ==
Library provides API for creation of user-defined objects, such as: constants, arguments, functions.

=== User-defined constants ===
Constant t = new Constant("t = 2*pi");
Expression e = new Expression("sin(t)", t);
double v = e.calculate();

=== User-defined arguments ===
Argument x = new Argument("x = 5");
Argument y = new Argument("y = 2*x", x);
Expression e = new Expression("sin(x)+y", x, y);
double v = e.calculate();

=== User-defined functions ===
Function f = new Function("f(x, y) = sin(x)+cos(y)");
Expression e = new Expression("f(1,2)", f);
double v = e.calculate();

=== User-defined variadic functions ===
Function f = new Function("f(...) = sum( i, 1, [npar], par(i) )");
Expression e = new Expression("f(1,2,3,4)", f);
double v = e.calculate();

=== User-defined recursion ===
Function fib = new Function("fib(n) = iff( n>1, fib(n-1)+fib(n-2); n=1, 1; n=0, 0 ) )");
Expression e = new Expression("fib(10)", fib);   
double v = e.calculate();

== Requirements ==
- Java: JDK 1.5 or higher
- .NET/Mono: framework 2.0 or higher

== Documentation ==
- Tutorial
- Javadoc API specification

== mXparser - source code ==
Source code is maintained and shared on GitHub.

== See also ==
- List of numerical libraries
- List of numerical analysis software
- Mathematical software
- Exp4j
