= Common Business Communication Language =

The Common Business Communication Language (CBCL) is a communications language proposed by John McCarthy that foreshadowed much of XML. The language consists of a basic framework of hierarchical markup derived from S-expressions, coupled with some general principles about use and extensibility. Although written in 1975, the proposal was not published until 1982, and to this day remains relatively obscure.
