= TOPPS (research group) =

Research group at Copenhagen University

TOPPS is a research group at Datalogisk institut, Copenhagen University (DIKU). TOPPS is an abbreviation of the Danish "Teori Og Praksis for ProgrammeringsSprog", which roughly translates into "Theory and practice of programming languages". The group web site states that they are a group of researchers with interest in "Semantics-based Program Analysis and Manipulation".
