= Simple public-key infrastructure =

Simple public key infrastructure (SPKI, pronounced spoo-key) was an attempt to overcome the complexity of traditional X.509 public key infrastructure. It was specified in two Internet Engineering Task Force (IETF) Request for Comments (RFC) specifications – RFC 2692 and RFC 2693 – from the IETF SPKI working group. These two RFCs never passed the "experimental" maturity level of the IETF's RFC status. The SPKI specification defined an authorization certificate format, providing for the delineation of privileges, rights or other such attributes (called authorizations) and binding them to a public key. In 1996, SPKI was merged with Simple Distributed Security Infrastructure (SDSI, pronounced sudsy) by Ron Rivest and Butler Lampson.

== History and overview ==
The original SPKI had identified principals only as public keys but allowed binding authorizations to those keys and delegation of authorization from one key to another. The encoding used was attribute:value pairing, similar to RFC 822 headers.

The original SDSI bound local names (of individuals or groups) to public keys (or other names), but carried authorization only in Access Control Lists (ACLs) and did not allow for delegation of subsets of a principal's authorization. The encoding used was standard S-expression. Sample RSA public key in SPKI in "advanced transport format" (for actual transport the structure would be Base64-encoded):

(public-key
   (rsa-pkcs1-md5
    (e #03#)
    (n
     |ANHCG85jXFGmicr3MGPj53FYYSY1aWAue6PKnpFErHhKMJa4HrK4WSKTO
     YTTlapRznnELD2D7lWd3Q8PD0lyi1NJpNzMkxQVHrrAnIQoczeOZuiz/yY
     VDzJ1DdiImixyb/Jyme3D0UiUXhd6VGAz0x0cgrKefKnmjy410Kro3uW1| )))

The combined SPKI/SDSI allows the naming of principals, creation of named groups of principals and the delegation of rights or other attributes from one principal to another. It includes a language for expression of authorization – a language that includes a definition of "intersection" of authorizations. It also includes the notion of threshold subject – a construct granting authorizations (or delegations) only when K of N of the listed subjects concur (in a request for access or a delegation of rights). SPKI/SDSI uses S-expression encoding, but specifies a binary form that is extremely easy to parse – an LR(0) grammar – called Canonical S-expressions.

SPKI/SDSI does not define a role for a commercial certificate authority (CA). In fact, one premise behind SPKI is that a commercial CA serves no useful purpose. As a result of that, SPKI/SDSI is deployed primarily in closed solutions and in demonstration projects of academic interest. Another side-effect of this design element is that it is difficult to monetize SPKI/SDSI by itself. It can be a component of some other product, but there is no business case for developing SPKI/SDSI tools and services except as part of some other product.

The most prominent general deployments of SPKI/SDSI are E-speak, a middleware product from HP that used SPKI/SDSI for access control of web methods, and UPnP Security, that uses an XML dialect of SPKI/SDSI for access control of web methods, delegation of rights among network participants, etc.

== See also ==
- SPKAC
