= Comparison of parser generators =

This is a list of notable lexer generators and parser generators for various language classes.

== Regular languages ==
Regular languages are a category of languages (sometimes termed Chomsky Type 3) which can be matched by a state machine (more specifically, by a deterministic finite automaton or a nondeterministic finite automaton) constructed from a regular expression. In particular, a regular language can match constructs like "A follows B", "Either A or B", "A, followed by zero or more instances of B", but cannot match constructs which require consistency between non-adjacent elements, such as "some instances of A followed by the same number of instances of B", and also cannot express the concept of recursive "nesting" ("every A is eventually followed by a matching B"). A classic example of a problem which a regular grammar cannot handle is the question of whether a given string contains correctly nested parentheses. (This is typically handled by a Chomsky Type 2 grammar, also termed a context-free grammar.)

Name	Lexer algorithm	Output languages	Grammar, code	Runtime	License
Alex	DFA	Haskell	Mixed	All	Free, BSD
AnnoFlex	DFA	Java	Mixed	JVM	Free, BSD
Astir	DFA table driven, with branching	C++	Only grammar (actioned)	All	Free, MIT
AustenX	DFA	Java	Separate	All	Free, BSD
C# Flex	DFA	C#	Mixed	.NET CLR	Free, GNU GPL
C# Lex	DFA	C#	Mixed	.NET CLR	?
CookCC	DFA	Java	Mixed	JVM	Free, Apache 2.0
DFA	DFA compressed matrix	C, C++	Separate	Windows, Visual Studio	BSD
Dolphin	DFA	C++	Separate	All	Proprietary
Flex	DFA table driven	C, C++	Mixed	All	Free, BSD
gelex	DFA	Eiffel	Mixed	Eiffel	Free, MIT
golex	DFA	Go	Mixed	Go	Free, BSD-style
gplex	DFA	C#	Mixed	.NET CLR	Free, BSD-like
JFlex	DFA	Java	Mixed	JVM	Free, BSD
JLex	DFA	Java	Mixed	JVM	Free, BSD-like
lex	DFA	C	Mixed	POSIX	Partial, proprietary, CDDL
lexertl	DFA	C++	?	All	Free, GNU LGPL
Quex	DFA direct code	C, C++	Mixed	All	Free, GNU LGPL
Ragel	DFA	Go, C, C++, Java, assembly	Mixed	All	Free, GNU GPL, MIT
RE/flex	DFA direct code, DFA table driven, and NFA regex libraries	C++	Mixed	All	Free, BSD
re2c	DFA direct code	C, C++, Go, Rust	Mixed	All	Free, public domain

== Deterministic context-free languages ==
Context-free languages are a category of languages (sometimes termed Chomsky Type 2) which can be matched by a sequence of replacement rules, each of which essentially maps each non-terminal element to a sequence of terminal elements and/or other nonterminal elements. Grammars of this type can match anything that can be matched by a regular grammar, and furthermore, can handle the concept of recursive "nesting" ("every A is eventually followed by a matching B"), such as the question of whether a given string contains correctly nested parentheses. The rules of Context-free grammars are purely local, however, and therefore cannot handle questions that require non-local analysis such as "Does a declaration exist for every variable that is used in a function?". To do so technically would require a more sophisticated grammar, like a Chomsky Type 1 grammar, also termed a context-sensitive grammar. However, parser generators for context-free grammars often support the ability for user-written code to introduce limited amounts of context-sensitivity. (For example, upon encountering a variable declaration, user-written code could save the name and type of the variable into an external data structure, so that these could be checked against later variable references detected by the parser.)

The deterministic context-free languages are a proper subset of the context-free languages which can be efficiently parsed by deterministic pushdown automata.

Name	Parsing algorithm	Input grammar notation	Output languages	Grammar, code	Lexer	Runtime	IDE	License
ANTLR4	Adaptive LL(*)	EBNF	C#, Java, Python, JavaScript, C++, Swift, Go, PHP	Separate	generated	JVM	Yes	Free, BSD
ANTLR3	LL(*)	EBNF	ActionScript, Ada95, C, C++, C#, Java, JavaScript, Objective-C, Perl, Python, Ruby	Mixed	generated	JVM	Yes	Free, BSD
APG	Recursive descent, backtracking	ABNF	Python, JavaScript, C, Java	Separate	none	All	No	Free, BSD
Beaver	LALR(1)	EBNF	Java	Mixed	external	JVM	No	Free, BSD
Bison	LALR(1), LR(1), IELR(1), GLR	Yacc	C, C++, D, Java	Mixed	external	All	No	Free, GNU GPL with exception
BtYacc	Backtracking Bottom-up	?	C++	Mixed	external	All	No	Free, public domain
byacc	LALR(1)	Yacc	C	Mixed	external	All	No	Free, public domain
CL-Yacc	LALR(1)	Lisp	Common Lisp	Mixed	external	All	No	Free, MIT
Coco/R	LL(1) + semantic predicates	EBNF	C, C++, C#, F#, Java, Ada, Object Pascal, Delphi, Modula-2, Oberon, Ruby, Swift, Unicon, Visual Basic .NET	Mixed	generated	JVM, .NET framework, Windows, POSIX (depends on output language)	No	Free, GNU GPL
CookCC	LALR(1), LR(1)	Yacc	Java	Mixed	generated	JVM	No	Free, Apache License 2.0
CppCC	LL(k)	?	C++	Mixed	generated	POSIX	No	Free, GNU GPL
CUP	LALR(1)	?	Java	Mixed	external	JVM	No	Free, BSD-like
Eli	LALR(1)	?	C	Mixed	generated	POSIX	No	Free, GNU GPL, GNU LGPL
Essence	LR(?)	?	Scheme 48	Mixed	external	All	No	Free, BSD
eyapp	LALR(1)	?	Perl	Mixed	external or generated	All	No	Free, Artistic
GOLD	LALR(1)	BNF	x86 assembly language, ANSI C, C#, D, Java, Pascal, Object Pascal, Python, Visual Basic 6, Visual Basic .NET, Visual C++	Separate	generated	Windows	Yes	Free, zlib modified
Hime Parser Generator	LALR(1), GLR	BNF dialect	C#, Java, Rust	Separate	generated	.NET framework, JVM	No	Free, GNU LGPL
Hyacc	LR(1), LALR(1), LR(0)	Yacc	C	Mixed	external	All	No	Free, GNU GPL
JavaCC	LL(k)	EBNF	Java, C++, JavaScript (via GWT compiler)	Mixed	generated	JVM	Yes	Free, BSD
JFLAP	LL(1), LALR(1)	?	Java	?	?	JVM	Yes	?
JetPAG	LL(k)	?	C++	Mixed	generated	All	No	Free, GNU GPL
JS/CC	LALR(1)	EBNF	JavaScript, JScript, ECMAScript	Mixed	internal	All	Yes	Free, BSD
KDevelop-PG-Qt	LL(1), backtracking, shunting-yard	?	C++	Mixed	generated or external	All, KDE	No	Free, GNU LGPL
Kelbt	Backtracking LALR(1)	?	C++	Mixed	generated	POSIX	No	Free, GNU GPL
kmyacc	LALR(1)	?	C, Java, Perl, JavaScript	Mixed	external	All	No	Free, GNU GPL
Lapg	LALR(1)	?	C, C++, C#, Java, JavaScript	Mixed	generated	JVM	No	Free, GNU GPL
Lark	LALR(1), Earley (SPPF)	EBNF derivative	Python, JavaScript	Mixed	generated	All	Yes	Free, MIT
Lemon	LALR(1)	BNF dialect	C	Mixed	external	All	No	Free, public domain
Lezer	LR(1), GLR	EBNF dialect	JavaScript	Separate	generated	Node.js, JavaScript	No	Free, MIT
Lime	LALR(1)	?	PHP	Mixed	external	All	No	Free, GNU GPL
LISA	LR(?), LL(?), LALR(?), SLR(?)	?	Java	Mixed	generated	JVM	Yes	Free, public domain
LLgen	LL(1)	?	C	Mixed	external	POSIX	No	Free, BSD
LLnextgen	LL(1)	?	C	Mixed	external	All	No	Free, GNU GPL
LLLPG	LL(k) + syntactic and semantic predicates	ANTLR-like	C#	Mixed	generated (?)	.NET framework, Mono	Visual Studio	Free, GNU LGPL
LPG	Backtracking LALR(k)	?	Java	Mixed	generated	JVM	No	Free, EPL
LRSTAR	LALR(1), LALR(*)	YACC, ANTLR, EBNF	C++	Separate	generated	Windows	Visual Studio	Free, BSD
Menhir	LR(1)	?	OCaml	Mixed	generated	All	No	Free, QPL
ML-Yacc	LALR(1)	?	ML	Mixed	external	All	No	?
Monkey	LR(1)	?	Java	Separate	generated	JVM	No	Free, GNU GPL
Msta	LALR(k), LR(k)	YACC, EBNF	C, C++	Mixed	external or generated	POSIX, Cygwin	No	Free, GNU GPL
MTP (More Than Parsing)	LL(1)	?	Java	Separate	generated	JVM	No	Free, GNU GPL
MyParser	LL(*)	Markdown	C++11	Separate	internal	Any with standard C++11 compiler	No	Free, MIT
NLT	GLR	C#/BNF-like	C#	Mixed	mixed	.NET framework	No	Free, MIT
ocamlyacc	LALR(1)	?	OCaml	Mixed	external	All	No	Free, QPL
olex	LL(1)	?	C++	Mixed	generated	All	No	Free, GNU GPL
Parsec	LL, backtracking	Haskell	Haskell	Mixed	none	All	No	Free, BSD
yapp	LALR(1)	?	Perl	Mixed	external	All	No	Free, GNU GPL
Parser Objects	LL(k)	?	Java	Mixed	?	JVM	No	Free, zlib
PCCTS	LL	?	C, C++	?	?	All	No	?
PLY	LALR(1)	BNF	Python	Mixed	generated	All	No	Free, MIT
PlyPlus	LALR(1)	EBNF	Python	Separate	generated	All	No	Free, MIT
PRECC	LL(k)	?	C	Separate	generated	MS-DOS, POSIX	No	Free, GNU GPL
QLALR	LALR(1)	?	C++	Mixed	external	All	No	Free, GNU GPL
racc	LALR(1)	BNF-like, yacc-like	Ruby	Mixed	?	Windows, Linux, macOS, FreeBSD, NetBSD	No	LGPL
REX	LL(1) sLL(k) LR(k) LALR(k) GLR PEG DFA Context-dependent lexing	EBNF	C++, C#, Java, JavaScript, Go, Haxe, Python, Scala, TypeScript, XQuery, XSLT	Separate	generated	All	No	Free, Apache License 2.0
SableCC	LALR(1)	?	C, C++, C#, Java, OCaml, Python	Separate	generated	JVM	No	Free, GNU LGPL
SLK	LL(k) LR(k) LALR(k)	EBNF	C, C++, C#, Java, JavaScript	Separate	external	All	No	SLK
SLY	LALR(1)	BNF	Python	Mixed	generated	All	No	Free, BSD
SP (Simple Parser)	Recursive descent	Python	Python	Separate	generated	All	No	Free, GNU LGPL
Spirit	Recursive descent	?	C++	Mixed	internal	All	No	Free, Boost
Styx	LALR(1)	?	C, C++	Separate	generated	All	No	Free, GNU LGPL
Sweet Parser	LALR(1)	?	C++	Separate	generated	Windows	No	Free, zlib
Tap	LL(1)	?	C++	Mixed	generated	All	No	Free, GNU GPL
TextTransformer	LL(k)	?	C++	Mixed	generated	Windows	Yes	Proprietary
TinyPG	LL(1)	?	C#, Visual Basic	?	?	Windows	Yes	Partial, CPOL 1.0
Toy Parser Generator	Recursive descent	?	Python	Mixed	generated	All	No	Free, GNU LGPL
TP Yacc	LALR(1)	?	Turbo Pascal	Mixed	external	All	Yes	Free, GNU GPL
Tree-Sitter	LR(1), GLR	JavaScript DSL, JSON	C, bindings (Rust, WebAssembly, JavaScript, Python, many other)	Separate	generated + external	All	Neovim, Helix, GNU Emacs, Lapce, Zed	Free, MIT
Tunnel Grammar Studio	Tunnel Parsing	ABNF	C++	Separate	generated	Windows	Yes	Proprietary
UltraGram	LALR(1), LR(1), GLR	BNF	C++, Java, C#, Visual Basic .NET	Separate	external	Windows	Yes	Free, public domain
UniCC	LALR(1)	EBNF	C, C++, Python, JavaScript, JSON, XML	Mixed	generated	POSIX	No	Free, BSD
UrchinCC	LL(1)	?	Java	?	generated	JVM	No	?
Yacc AT&T/Sun	LALR(1)	Yacc	C	Mixed	external	POSIX	No	Free, CPL & CDDL
Yacc++	LR(1), LALR(1)	Yacc	C++, C#	Mixed	generated or external	All	No	Proprietary
Yapps	LL(1)	?	Python	Mixed	generated	All	No	Free, MIT
yecc	LALR(1)	?	Erlang	Separate	generated	All	No	Free, Apache 2.0
Visual BNF	LR(1), LALR(1)	?	C#	Separate	generated	.NET framework	Yes	Proprietary
YooParse	LR(1), LALR(1)	?	C++	Mixed	external	All	No	Free, MIT
Parse	LR(1)	BNF in C++ types	?	?	none	C++11 standard compiler	No	Free, MIT
GGLL	LL(1)	Graph	Java	Mixed	generated	Windows	Yes	Free, MIT
Product	Parsing algorithm	Input grammar notation	Output languages	Grammar, code	Lexer	Runtime	IDE	License

== Parsing expression grammars, deterministic Boolean grammars ==
This table compares parser generators with parsing expression grammars, deterministic Boolean grammars.

Name	Parsing algorithm	Output languages	Grammar, code	Runtime	License
AustenX	Packrat (modified)	Java	Separate	All	Free, BSD
Aurochs	Packrat	C, OCaml, Java	Mixed	All	Free, GNU GPL
BNFlite	Recursive descent	C++	Mixed	All	Free, MIT
Canopy	Packrat	Java, JavaScript, Python, Ruby	Separate	All	Free, GNU GPL
CL-peg	Packrat	Common Lisp	Mixed	All	Free, MIT
Drat!	Packrat	D	Mixed	All	Free, GNU GPL
Frisby	Packrat	Haskell	Mixed	All	Free, BSD
grammar::peg	Packrat	Tcl	Mixed	All	Free, BSD
Grako	Packrat + Cut + Left Recursion	Python, C++ (beta)	Separate	All	Free, BSD
IronMeta	Packrat	C#	Mixed	Windows	Free, BSD
Laja	2-phase scannerless top-down backtracking + runtime support	Java	Separate	All	Free, GNU GPL
lars::Parser	Packrat (supporting left-recursion and grammar ambiguity)	C++	Identical	All	Free, BSD
LPeg	Parsing machine	Lua	Mixed	All	Free, MIT
lug	Parsing machine	C++17	Mixed	All	Free, MIT
Mouse	Recursive descent (modified, limited memoization and left-recursion)	Java	Separate	JVM	Free, Apache 2.0
Narwhal	Packrat	C	Mixed	POSIX, Windows	Free, BSD
Nearley	Earley	JavaScript	Mixed	All	Free, MIT
Nemerle.Peg	Recursive descent + Pratt	Nemerle	Separate	All	Free, BSD
neotoma	Packrat	Erlang	Separate	All	Free, MIT
nez	Parsing machine	Java, C	Separate	JVM	Free, BSD
NPEG	Recursive descent	C#	Mixed	All	Free, MIT
OMeta	Packrat (modified, partial memoization)	JavaScript, Squeak, Python	Mixed	All	Free, MIT
PackCC	Packrat (modified, left-recursion support)	C	Mixed	All	Free, MIT
Packrat	Packrat	Scheme	Mixed	All	Free, MIT
Pappy	Packrat	Haskell	Mixed	All	Free, BSD
parboiled	Recursive descent	Java, Scala	Mixed	JVM	Free, Apache 2.0
Lambda PEG	Recursive descent	Java	Mixed	JVM	Free, Apache 2.0
parsepp	Recursive descent	C++	Mixed	All	Free, public domain
Parsnip	Packrat	C++	Mixed	Windows	Free, GNU GPL
Patterns	Parsing machine	Swift	Identical	All	Free, MIT
peg	Recursive descent	C	Mixed	All	Free, MIT
PEG.js	Packrat (partial memoization)	JavaScript	Mixed	All	Free, MIT
Peggy	Packrat (partial memoization)	JavaScript	Mixed	All	Free, MIT
Pegasus	Recursive descent, Packrat (selectively)	C#	Mixed	Windows	Free, MIT
pegc	Recursive descent	C	Mixed	All	Free, public domain
pest	Recursive descent	Rust	Separate	All	Free, MIT, Apache 2.0
PetitParser	Packrat	Smalltalk, Java, Dart	Mixed	All	Free, MIT
PEGTL	Recursive descent	C++11, C++17	Mixed	All	Free, Boost
Parser Grammar Engine (PGE)	Hybrid recursive descent / operator precedence	Parrot bytecode	Mixed	Parrot virtual machine	Free, Artistic 2.0
PyPy rlib	Packrat	Python	Mixed	All	Free, MIT
Rats!	Packrat	Java	Mixed	JVM	Free, GNU LGPL
Spirit2	Recursive descent	C++	Mixed	All	Free, Boost
Treetop	Recursive descent	Ruby	Mixed	All	Free, MIT
Yard	Recursive descent	C++	Mixed	All	Free, MIT or public domain
Waxeye	Parsing machine	C, Java, JavaScript, Python, Racket, Ruby	Separate	All	Free, MIT
PHP PEG	PEG Parser?	PHP	Mixed	All	Free, BSD

== General context-free, conjunctive, or Boolean languages ==
This table compares parser generator languages with a general context-free grammar, a conjunctive grammar, or a Boolean grammar.

Name	Parsing algorithm	Input grammar notation	Output languages	Grammar, code	Lexer	Runtime	IDE	License
ACCENT	Earley	Yacc variant	C	Mixed	external	All	No	Free, GNU GPL
APaGeD	GLR, LALR(1), LL(k)	?	D	Mixed	generated	All	No	Free, Artistic
Bison	LALR(1), LR(1), IELR(1), GLR	Yacc	C, C++, D, Java, XML	Mixed, except XML	external	All	No	Free, GNU GPL
DMS Software Reengineering Toolkit	GLR	?	Parlanse	Mixed	generated	Windows	No	Proprietary
DParser	Scannerless GLR	?	C	Mixed	scannerless	POSIX	No	Free, BSD
Dypgen	Runtime-extensible GLR	?	OCaml	Mixed	generated	All	No	Free, CeCILL-B
E3	Earley	?	OCaml	Mixed	external, or scannerless	All	No	?
Elkhound	GLR	?	C++, OCaml	Mixed	external	All	No	Free, BSD
GDK	LALR(1), GLR	?	C, Lex, Haskell, HTML, Java, Object Pascal, Yacc	Mixed	generated	POSIX	No	Free, MIT
Happy	LALR, GLR	?	Haskell	Mixed	external	All	No	Free, BSD
Hime Parser Generator	GLR	?	C#, Java, Rust	Separate	generated	.NET framework, JVM	No	Free, GNU LGPL
IronText Library	LALR(1), GLR	C#	C#	Mixed	generated or external	.NET framework	No	Free, Apache 2.0
Jison	LALR(1), LR(0), SLR(1)	Yacc	JavaScript, C#, PHP	Mixed	generated	All	No	Free, MIT
Syntax	LALR(1), LR(0), SLR(1) CLR(1) LL(1)	JSON/Yacc	JavaScript, Python, PHP, Ruby, C++, C#, Rust, Java	Mixed	generated	All	No	Free, MIT
Laja	Scannerless, two phase	Laja	Java	Separate	scannerless	All	No	Free, GNU GPL
ModelCC	Earley	Annotated class model	Java	Generated	generated	All	No	Free, BSD
P3	Earley–combinators	BNF-like	OCaml	Mixed	external, or scannerless	All	No	?
P4	Earley–combinators, infinitary CFGs	BNF-like	OCaml	Mixed	external, or scannerless	All	No	?
Scannerless Boolean Parser	Scannerless GLR (Boolean grammars)	?	Haskell, Java	Separate	scannerless	JVM	No	Free, BSD
SDF/SGLR	Scannerless GLR	SDF	C, Java	Separate	scannerless	All	Yes	Free, BSD
SmaCC	GLR(1), LALR(1), LR(1)	?	Smalltalk	Mixed	internal	All	Yes	Free, MIT
SPARK	Earley	?	Python	Mixed	external	All	No	Free, MIT
Tom	GLR	?	C	Generated	none	All	No	Free, "No licensing or copyright restrictions"
UltraGram	LALR, LR, GLR	?	C++, C#, Java, Visual Basic .NET	Separate	generated	Windows	Yes	Proprietary
Wormhole	Pruning, LR, GLR, Scannerless GLR	?	C, Python	Mixed	scannerless	Windows	No	Free, MIT
Whale Calf	General tabular, SLL(k), Linear normal form (conjunctive grammars), LR, Binary normal form (Boolean grammars)	?	C++	Separate	external	All	No	Proprietary
yaep	Earley	Yacc-like	C	Mixed	external	All	No	Free, GNU LGPL

== Context-sensitive grammars ==
This table compares parser generators with context-sensitive grammars.

Name	Parsing algorithm	Input grammar notation	Boolean grammar abilities	Runtime	License
bnf2xml	Recursive descent (is a text filter output is xml)	simple BNF grammar (input matching), output is xml	?	Beta, and not a full EBNF parser	Free, GNU GPL

== See also ==
- Compiler-compiler
- List of program transformation systems
- Comparison of regular expression engines
