= GLL =

GLL may refer to:

- Air Gemini
- Garlali language
- Good language learner studies
- Gol Airport, Klanten, Norway
- Great Lakes League
- Grand Landlodge of the Freemasons of Germany
- Greenwich Leisure Limited
- The GLL parser algorithm, generalised left-to-right, leftmost derivation.
- The Gauss–Lobatto–Legendre or Gauss–Lobatto quadrature scheme
