= SYSTEM.INI =

Configuration file for Microsoft Windows

SYSTEM.INI is an initialization (INI file) used in early versions of Microsoft Windows (from 1.01 up to Me) to load device drivers and the default Windows shell (Program Manager or Windows Explorer), among other system settings. Many of these settings were honored in Windows 9x (95, 98 and Me), although the INI files had begun to be phased out in favor of the Windows Registry. Windows NT 4.0, 2000, XP and Server 2003 still acknowledge some SYSTEM.INI entries in order to provide backwards compatibility with older 16-bit applications. Windows Vista and beyond also have SYSTEM.INI as well. However, when a fresh install of XP/Server 2003 is performed, the SYSTEM.INI file created contains by default only these lines:

; for 16-bit app support
[drivers]
wave=mmdrv.dll
timer=timer.drv
[mci]
[driver32]
[386enh]
woafont=dosapp.FON
EGA80WOA.FON=EGA80WOA.FON
EGA40WOA.FON=EGA40WOA.FON
CGA80WOA.FON=CGA80WOA.FON
CGA40WOA.FON=CGA40WOA.FON

== Editing ==
Microsoft bundles two specialized text/ASCII editors for core configuration files (such as PROTOCOL.INI, WIN.INI, SYSTEM.INI, CONFIG.SYS, and AUTOEXEC.BAT) with its operating systems. Sysedit is an MDI text editor that opens all these files simultaneously, available in all versions of Windows beginning with Windows 3.0, except Me and no longer after Windows 7. MSConfig is a front end interface application that allows the user to enable and disable drivers, Windows shell and applications separately from being loaded at startup by the aforementioned files and from the Run, RunEx, and RunOnce Windows Registry keys.
