= WIN.INI =

Basic INI file

WIN.INI is a basic INI file that was used in versions of the Microsoft Windows operating environment up to Windows 3.11 to store basic settings at boot time. By default, all font, communications drivers, wallpaper, screen saver, and language settings were stored in WIN.INI by Windows 3.x. Many of these settings were honored in Windows 9x, although the files had begun to be phased out in favor of the Windows registry. Windows XP still acknowledged some entries in the WIN.INI file to provide backwards compatibility with older 16-bit applications. However, when a fresh install of XP is performed, the WIN.INI file created is initially blank, and in Windows Vista and Windows 7 the WIN.INI file was removed entirely.

Prior to Windows 3.0, it was not uncommon for applications to store their configuration settings inside WIN.INI (via GetProfileString). With the release of Windows 3.0 in 1990, Microsoft introduced the concept of "private" INI files (i.e. GetPrivateProfileString), and some new application programming interface calls so that applications could store their settings in their own files.

In 1992, Windows 3.1 introduced the Windows Registry for storing settings.

== Editing ==
Microsoft bundles two specialized editors for core configuration files (such as WIN.INI, SYSTEM.INI, CONFIG.SYS, and AUTOEXEC.BAT) with its operating systems. Sysedit is an MDI text editor that opens all of those files simultaneously, available in all versions of Windows since Windows 3.x (until Windows 7). MSConfig, included with Windows 98 and above except Windows 2000, is a simpler application that allows a user to enable and disable drivers and applications from being loaded at startup by the aforementioned files and the Run, RunEx, and RunOnce registry keys. WIN.INI and SYSTEM.INI are included in modern versions of Windows for 16-bit application support. 16-bit applications may display an error if these two files do not exist in C:\Windows.

== See also ==
- Make Compatible
