= Scannerless Boolean Parser =

SBP
- Developer: Adam Megacz
- Stable release: 1.0 / 2009
- Platform: Java Virtual Machine
- Type: Parser generator
- License: BSD license
- Website: archived home page

The Scannerless Boolean Parser is an open-source scannerless GLR parser generator for boolean grammars. It was implemented in the Java programming language and generates Java source code. SBP also integrates with Haskell via LambdaVM.
