= Tree-sitter (parser generator) =

Parser generator and library

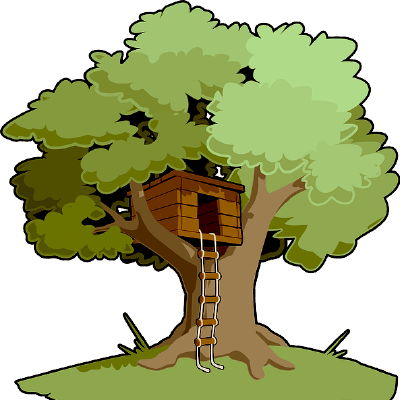
- Original author: Max Brunsfeld
- Release: 2018; 8 years ago
- Stable release: 0.27.0 / 30 August 2026; 12 days ago
- Written in: Rust, C
- Platform: Cross-platform
- Type: Parser generator
- License: MIT License
- Website: tree-sitter.github.io/tree-sitter/
- Repository: github.com/tree-sitter/tree-sitter

Tree-sitter is a free and open-source parser generator and incremental parsing library. It is used to parse source code into concrete syntax trees usable in compilers, interpreters, text editors, and static analyzers. It is specialized for use in text editors, as it supports incremental parsing for updating parse trees while code is edited in real time, and provides a built-in S-expression query system for analyzing code.

Text editors which have official integrations with Tree-sitter include GNU Emacs, Neovim, Lapce, Zed, Helix, and Atom. Language bindings allow it to be used from programming languages including Go, Haskell, Java, JavaScript (with Node.js and WASM), Julia, Kotlin, Lua, OCaml, Perl, Python, Ruby, Rust, Swift, and Zig. Tree-sitter parsers have been written for these languages and many others. GitHub uses Tree-sitter to support in-browser symbolic code navigation in Git repositories.

Tree-sitter uses a GLR parser, a type of LR parser.

Tree-sitter was originally developed by GitHub for use in the Atom text editor, where it was first released in 2018.

== See also ==
- Comparison of parser generators
