= EditorConfig =

Specification and file format

- Type of format: INI configuration file
- Standard: spec.editorconfig.org
- Open format?: Yes
- Free format?: Yes
- Website: editorconfig.org

EditorConfig is an open specification and file format for syntax highlighting, text editors and integrated development environment (IDEs) that aims to maintain a consistent coding style, particularly aimed at groups working together. It can help keep multiple editors as well as individuals using the same conventions. It stores configurations in a file which can be shared by multiple people or used in multiple editors (by the same person or by many). It defines rules for how to format different programming languages or other structured text files with conventions such as what character to end a line with and how to manage indentation.

== Concept ==
The project web site states "EditorConfig helps maintain consistent coding styles for multiple developers working on the same project across various editors and IDEs. The EditorConfig project consists of a file format for defining coding styles and a collection of text editor plugins that enable editors to read the file format and adhere to defined styles. EditorConfig files are easily readable and they work nicely with version control systems."

== Specification ==
The configuration is typically stored in a UTF-8 encoded text file: .editorconfig. Some tools allow saving their style preferences as an EditorConfig file. Each line:

- May be blank (only whitespace characters)
- A comment that begins with ; or #
- A section header, which starts with a square bracket [, and ends with a square bracket ].
  - A section header may not have any non-whitespace characters outside of the brackets
  - It may contain any characters between the brackets including whitespace/tabs
  - It uses forward slash characters / as path separators
    - Backslashes \ are prohibited, even on Windows.
- Key–value pair, with a = separating the key from the value

Any other line format is invalid. It does not support in-line comments. If there is a ; or # character anywhere other than the start of line it is considered to be part of the text of the line. It does not support any character escaping.

=== Parts/sections of file ===
- Preamble: optional key=value pairs that precede the first section.
- Section Name: String between [ ]
- Section: the key value pairs that follow a section name until the start of the next section.

=== glob expressions ===
Section names are file path globs, using a format similar to .gitignore, and are based on Unix conventions.

File name globs
Characters	Matched files
*	Any string (of any length) except path separators (/
**	Any string of characters
?	Any single character
[seq]	Any single character in the seq
[!seq]	Any single character not in seq
{s_{1},s_{2},..s_{n}}	Any of the comma-separated list of strings. This can be nested. There must be more than one string in the list, as {somestring} will match the literal value '{somestring}' (which is probably not what was intended).
{n_{1}..n_{2}}	Matches an integer number between n_{1} and n_{2} (i.e. matches $i \isin \mathbb{Z} | n_1 \le i \le n_2$)

=== File location ===
EditorConfig plugins look for a file named .editorconfig in the same directory that contains an existing file, and in parent directories of that one until it hits the root file path (e.g. / in Linux/Unix/macOS or C: in the case of Microsoft Windows, or it finds an .editorconfig file that contains a line that states root=true.

The most recent rules found take precedence in the order they are read. So rules in the same directory as the file would over-rule rules from higher level directories.

=== File format ===
Editor config uses the common INI configuration file format.

=== Style options ===
Configuration options
Key	Settings to configure the option
indent_style	Set to use "tab" or "space" to use tab characters or spaces
indent_size	Integer that defines how many spaces per tab, or how wide a tab stop is.
tab_width	This usually isn't specified as it defaults to the indent_size
end_of_line	Set to "lf" , "cr", or "crlf" to control how line breaks are represented.
charset	Character encoding "latin1", "utf-8", "utf-8-bom", "utf-16be" or "utf-16le" to control the character set.
trim_trailing_whitespace	If set to "true" will remove any whitespace characters preceding newline characters
insert_final_newline	If "true" will end files with a newline, "false" will prevent it.
root	Special property (e.g. specified at the top of the file outside of any sections). Set to "true" to stop .editorconfig files search on current file. (I.e. don't keep looking for any more EditorConfig files in higher level directories.

Some tools support additional options such as max_line_length (which forces a hard line wrap after the specified number of characters) (supported by Emacs, Vim, Atom, and several others)

== Implementation ==
Many popular editors have adopted support of the specification. The GitHub page for the project has libraries written in Go programing language, C programing language, and Python programming language, and there is a Node.JS library as well. There is a comprehensive listing of editors available on the project site.

=== Editors reported to work without use of a plug-in ===
Gitea, GitHub, IntelliJ IDEA, PyCharm, BBEdit, Xcode 16, Kate, GNU Emacs, Komodo, Visual Studio, Vim/Neovim, and editors by JetBrains.

=== Editors which require a plug-in ===
Some editors require installation of a plug-in: Eclipse IDE, Atom, Geany, JEdit, Notepad++, NetBeans, Visual Studio Code, Sublime Text

=== Build environments which require a plug-in ===
Apache Ant, Gradle, Apache Maven

=== Editors which don't support EditorConfig ===
There is no list maintained of all the various text editors or IDEs which do not support EditorConfig (e.g. Spyder IDE has had support mentioned in the past, but does not seem to yet include it).

=== Other software development tools which implement EditorConfig ===
Prettier
