= CodeProject =

Online community for programmers

- Website type: Network for computer programmers
- Available in: English
- Owner: CodeProject Solutions Inc.
- Creators: Chris Maunder, David Cunningham
- Website: www.codeproject.com
- Commercial: No
- Registration: Optional, but required for voting, commenting, downloading source code, and posting on the discussion boards.
- Users: 15,542,187 (January 2023)
- Current status: offline

CodeProject (formerly Code Project and The Code Project) was a community for computer programmers with articles on different topics and programming languages such as web development, software development, C++, Java, and other topics. Once a visitor registered a user account on the site, they could gain "reputation" which unlocked various privileges such as the ability to store personal files in the user's account area, have live hyperlinks in their profile biography, and more. Members could also write and upload their own articles and code for other visitors to view.

== Acquisition, closure, move ==
In October 2024, the business behind the CodeProject website, CodeProject Solutions Inc., switched the site into read-only mode citing significant financial losses due to the tech recession. CodeProject was acquired by D2 Emerge LLC in November 2024.

Despite the reopening business, codeproject.com and forum.codeproject.com went offline in March 2026. The Wayback Machine of the Internet Archive preserves much of the content.

== Overview ==
Articles can be related to general programming, GUI design, algorithms, or collaboration. Most of the articles are uploaded by visitors and do not come from external sources. Nearly every article is accompanied with source code and examples which can be downloaded independently. Most articles and sources are released under the Code Project Open License (CPOL), although the license can be configured by the user. These articles either go through a moderation and editing phase or are immediately posted as unedited reader contributions.

CodeProject employed a rating and comment system that helps to filter the good articles from the poor. It also had forums, and was a resource for resolving difficult software development issues.

Rather than being just a collection of samples, contributors were encouraged to explain concepts and ideas, and discuss design decisions. A separate format, "Tips and Tricks", was introduced in 2010 as a place to post short code snippets that don't fit the requirements for an article.

CodeProject strove to be a wealth of information and a valuable resource. The site encourages users to share what source code or knowledge they can in order to give back to the community.

CodeProject also conducted interviews with notable developers. CodeProject also awarded CodeProject Members Choice Awards in various categories. These awards were based on the votes of CodeProject members and editors, reflecting which companies and products application developers value most.

Users could also be awarded MVP status with CodeProject, which was presented to a small handful of people. CodeProject's Most Valuable Professional award was given to those members who had contributed the most to the community in both article submissions and in answering questions on the site. The award was given annually.

== Community ==
There were non-programming forums, where members could discuss news and sporting events, or comment on the latest thread. There was a high volume of posts to these, mainly in "The Lounge". They hit the 10-million-member mark in August 2013.

== Languages ==
CodeProject contains articles and code pertaining to the following programming languages:

- C/C++ (emphasis on Microsoft Foundation Classes, but many other domains are dealt with)
- C#
- ASP
- Ajax
- Common Lisp
- Delphi
- Java
- JavaScript
- Perl
- Python
- SQL
- VB.NET

== Topics ==
CodeProject contains articles pertaining to the following topics:

- Android
- Programming
- Graphics
- Internet of Things
- iOS
- Mobile Development
- Web Development

== See also ==
- Code Project Open License
