= Sysedit =

System Configuration Editor
- Developer: Microsoft
- Operating system: Microsoft Windows
- Type: Configuration management
- License: Bundled application under parent OS license
- Website: www.microsoft.com

System Configuration Editor, commonly known by its filename Sysedit, is a specialized text/ASCII editor for core Microsoft Windows configuration files (such as PROTOCOL.INI, WIN.INI, SYSTEM.INI, CONFIG.SYS, and AUTOEXEC.BAT). This executable is installed in the Windows system directory: %windir%\SYSTEM (Windows 3.x and 9x editions) or %windir%\SYSTEM32 (Windows NT editions). Sysedit was bundled with and automatically installed by every version of Windows from Windows 3.0 up to Windows 98 SE. Support was discontinued with Windows Me. Sysedit features a multiple-document interface, opening all of the aforementioned configuration files at once in separate daughter windows whenever launched.

Other Microsoft operating systems that include Sysedit are Windows XP, Windows Vista (Service Pack 2), Windows Server 2008, and Windows 7 (32-bit only).

== See also ==
- MSConfig
