= Scannerless parsing =

Algorithm that combines tokenization and parsing

In computer science, scannerless parsing (also called lexerless parsing) performs tokenization (breaking a stream of characters into words) and parsing (arranging the words into phrases) in a single step, rather than breaking it up into a pipeline of a lexer followed by a parser, executing concurrently. A language grammar is scannerless if it uses a single formalism to express both the lexical (word level) and phrase level structure of the language.

Dividing processing into a lexer followed by a parser is more modular; scannerless parsing is primarily used when a clear lexer–parser distinction is unneeded or unwanted. Examples of when this is appropriate include TeX, most wiki grammars, makefiles, simple application-specific scripting languages, and Raku.

== Advantages ==
- Only one metalanguage is needed
- Non-regular lexical structure is handled easily
- "Token classification" is unneeded which removes the need for design accommodations such as "the lexer hack" and language reserved words (such as "while" in C)
- Grammars can be compositional (can be merged without human intervention) ^{[a]}

== Disadvantages ==
- Since the lexical scanning and syntactic parsing are combined, the resulting parser tends to be more complicated and thus harder to understand and debug. The same will hold for the associated grammar, if a grammar is used to generate the parser.
- The resulting parser tends to be significantly less efficient than a lexer-parser pipeline with regard to both time and memory.

== Implementations ==
- SGLR is a parser for the modular Syntax Definition Formalism (SDF), and is part of the ASF+SDF Meta-Environment and the Stratego/XT program transformation system.
- JSGLR, a pure Java implementation of SGLR, also based on SDF.
- TXL supports character-level parsing.
- dparser generates ANSI C code for scannerless GLR parsers.
- Spirit allows for both scannerless and scanner-based parsing.
- SBP is a scannerless parser for Boolean grammars (a superset of context-free grammars), written in Java.
- Laja is a two-phase scannerless parser generator with support for mapping the grammar rules into objects, written in Java.
- The Raku grammars feature of the general purpose programming language Raku.
- PyParsing is a scannerless parser written in pure Python.
- META II Has built in token parsers functions.
- TREE-META Like META II also is scannerless having builtin lexer functions.
- CWIC compiler for writing and implementing compilers. Has token rules as part of its language. Rules in CWIC were compiled into Boolean functions returning success or failure.

== Notes ==
- ^{a} This is because parsing at the character level makes the language recognized by the parser a single context-free language defined on characters, as opposed to a context-free language of sequences of strings in regular languages. Some lexerless parsers handle the entire class of context-free languages, which is closed under composition.
