= Code Project Open License =

Software license

- Author: The Code Project
- Latest version: 1.02
- Publisher: The Code Project
- Published: April 15, 2008
- SPDX identifier: CPOL-1.02
- Debian FSG compatible: No
- FSF approved: No
- OSI approved: No
- GPL compatible: No
- Copyleft: No
- Linking from code with a different licence: Unclear
- Website: www.codeproject.com/info/cpol10.aspx

The Code Project Open License (CPOL) is a software license published by The Code Project, a community site for software developers. The license is mainly applied to content that is being published on the site.

== License ==
The main points subject to the terms of the license are:

- Source Code and Executable Files can be used in commercial applications;
- Source Code and Executable Files can be redistributed; and
- Source Code can be modified to create derivative works;
- No claim of suitability, guarantee, or any warranty whatsoever is provided. The software is provided "as-is";
- The Article(s) accompanying the Work may not be distributed or republished without the Author's consent;
- Executable Files and Source Code may not be distributed with any technological measures that control access or use of the Work in a manner inconsistent with the terms of the License.

The license itself grants copyright and patent protection to the developer. The Code Project has a comparison of the CPOL to open-source licenses on their site. Further, the license provides a distinction and clarification between the source code available for download and the source code's author's articles and writings about that content.

== Status as an open-source license ==
The "Open" in the name Code Project Open License refers to the license offering accessibility to the software's source code. The license is not "Open" as defined by the Open Source Initiative because it places restrictions on how the software can be used, such as forbidding its use in illegal, immoral or improper material as well as a prohibition on commercial distribution of the code in isolation.

The CPOL is strictly for source code that is gratis, but is not recognized as a free or open license by the Free Software Foundation due to the restrictions within the CPOL forbidding usage for illegal purposes and the restrictions on selling the code without coupling it to a larger application. The license is thus incompatible with the GNU General Public License and some other free software licenses, and inconsistent with the Open Source Definition, which requires that a license not discriminate against fields of endeavor. The Apache Software Foundation does not accept code under this license.

== See also ==
- Free software licence
- Open-source software
