= GLL parser =

Parsing algorithm for context-free languages

- Class: Parsing, context-free
- Data structure: String
- Worst-case performance: $O(n)$ for LL(1) grammars; $O(n^3)$ for ambiguous context-free grammars

A GLL parser (Generalized Left to right, Leftmost derivation) is a parser based on a modification of LL parsers to recognize languages described by any context-free grammar. While the theory behind "generalising" deterministic parsers had already been developed by Bernard Lang in 1974, it wasn't until 1999 that a GLL parser was implemented, although no proof of correctness was given at the time. The algorithm was later rediscovered by Scott et al. who developed a GLL parser starting from a recursive descent parser.

== Algorithm ==
Most implementations of GLL parsers use a recursive descent parser as their base and replace the normal stack with a graph-structured stack, similar to the GLR algorithm. Whereas recursive descent parsers usually make implicit use of the function-call-stack, a GLL parser will have to manage its stack explicitly. This means that for a recursive descent parser to be turned into a GLL parser, a few smaller transformations have to be made first.

Similarly to GLR, the resulting parse forest is usually represented in a shared packed parse forest (SPPF). However, newer, simpler methods have been developed as well.

== Advantages ==
Due to being based on recursive descent parsers, the source code for a GLL parser will usually closely match the grammar it parses. Compared to GLR, GLL parsers are generally easier to implement and, due to their top-down nature, can generate better error messages.

== See also ==
- GLR parser
- LL parser
- Earley parser
