= Graph-structured stack =

In computer science, a graph-structured stack (GSS) is a directed acyclic graph where each directed path represents a stack. The graph-structured stack is an essential part of Tomita's algorithm, where it replaces the usual stack of a pushdown automaton. This allows the algorithm to encode the nondeterministic choices in parsing an ambiguous grammar, sometimes with greater efficiency.

In the following diagram, there are four stacks: {7,3,1,0}, {7,4,1,0}, {7,5,2,0}, and {8,6,2,0}.

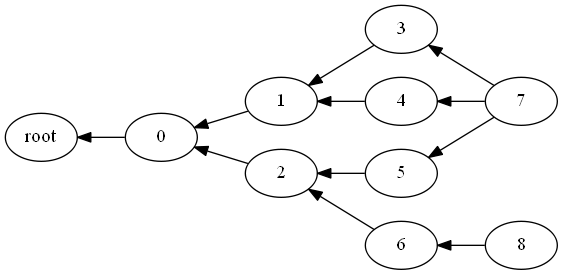

Another way to simulate nondeterminism would be to duplicate the stack as needed. The duplication would be less efficient since vertices would not be shared. For this example, 16 vertices would be needed instead of 9.

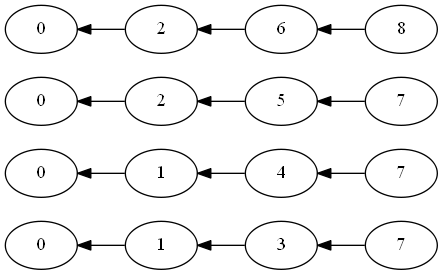

== Operations ==
GSSnode* GSS::add(GSSnode* prev, int elem)
{
	int prevlevel = prev->level;
	assert(levels.size() >= prevlevel + 1);
	int level = prevlevel + 1;
	if (levels.size() == level)
	{
		levels.resize(level + 1);
	}
	GSSnode* node = findElemAtLevel(level, elem);
	if (node == nullptr)
	{
		node = new GSSnode();
		node->elem = elem;
		node->level = level;		
		levels[level].push_back(node);
	}
	node->add(prev);
	return node;
}

void GSS::remove(GSSnode* node)
{
	if (levels.size() > node->level + 1)
		if (findPrevAtLevel(node->level + 1, node)) throw Exception("Can remove only from top.");
	for (int i = 0; i < levels[node->level].size(); i++)
		if (levels[node->level][i] == node)
		{
			levels[node->level].erase(levels[node->level].begin() + i);
			break;
		}
	delete node;
}
