= Gol Airport, Klanten =

Gol Airport, Klanten Gol flyplass, Klanten
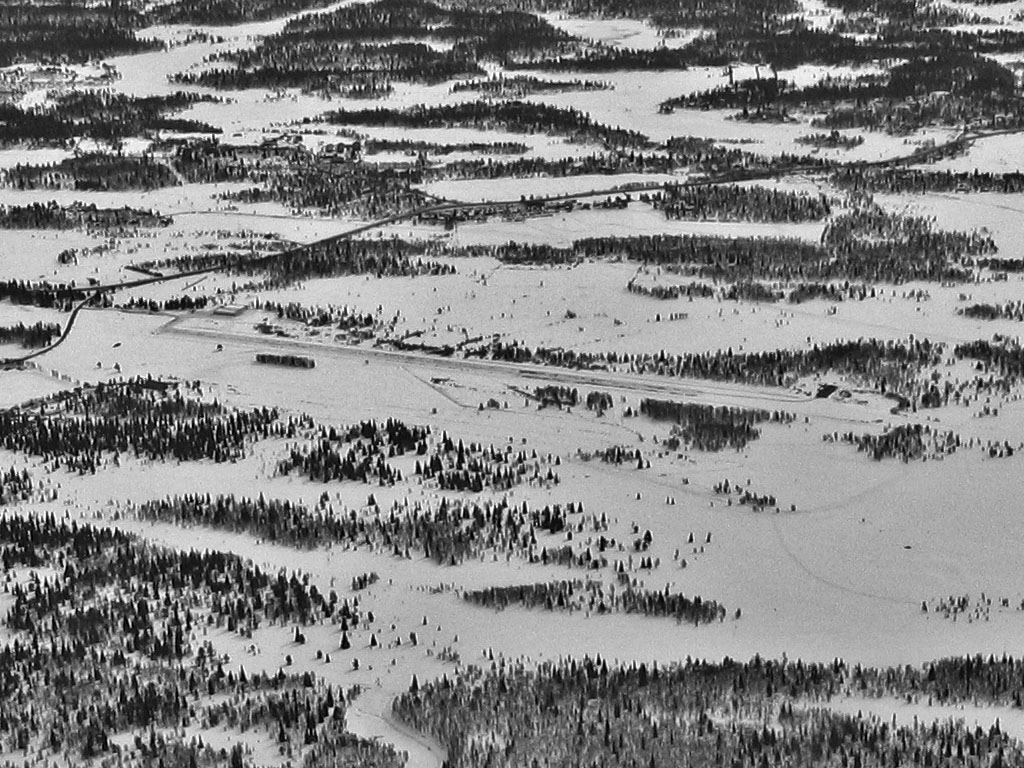
- Klanten seen from the north
- IATA: GLL; ICAO: ENKL

Summary
- Airport type: Private
- Serves: Gol Municipality, Buskerud, Norway
- Location: Golsfjellet
- Elevation AMSL: 2,720 ft (830 m)
- Coordinates: 60°47′27″N 009°03′02″E

Map
- Location within Norway

Runways
Direction	Length		Surface
Direction	m	ft	Surface
11/29	1,150	3,773	600x12 meter asphalt

Gol Airport, Klanten (Norwegian: Gol flyplass, Klanten; IATA: GLL, ICAO: ENKL) is an airport which lies on Golsfjellet north of the village of Gol in Gol Municipality in Buskerud county, Norway.

The airstrip is 1,150 metres (3,773 ft) long and is open summer and winter. The altitude is 829 metres (2,720 ft) and the airstrip's bearings are 11 and 29.
