= Most vexing parse =

Syntactic ambiguity in C++

The most vexing parse is a counterintuitive ambiguity resolution in C++. In certain situations, the C++ grammar cannot distinguish between initializing an object parameter, declaring an object or declaring a function while specifying the function's return type. In these situations, the compiler is required to interpret the statement as the latter, even though this is rarely the programmer's intention.

The problem originates from backward compatibility constraints imposed by the need for C++ to be a superset of C. C has no concept of object creation, and thus will always parse the code as a function declaration. C++ introduced syntax for object creation that inadvertently coincides with function type declaration in some cases.

The term was first used by Scott Meyers in his 2001 book Effective STL. It was a common problem for C++ versions prior to C++11, which introduced an alternative syntax called uniform initialization that uses braces {} instead of parentheses (), avoiding the syntactic ambiguity.

== Examples ==
=== C-style cast ===
A simple example appears when a functional cast is intended to convert an expression for initializing a variable:

void f(double x) {
    // An integer named i is assigned a C-style-cast value.
    int i(int(x));
}

The line int i(int(x)); is ambiguous. One possible interpretation is to declare a variable i with initial value produced by converting x to an int. However, C allows superfluous parentheses around function parameter declarations; in this case, the declaration of i is instead a function declaration equivalent to the following:

// A function named i takes an integer and returns an integer.
int i(int x);

=== Unnamed temporary ===
A more elaborate example is:

class Timer {
private:
    // fields...
public:
    // constructor, etc.

    int getTime() {
        // return time as an int
    }
};

class TimeKeeper {
private:
    Timer timer;
public:
    explicit TimeKeeper(Timer timer):
        timer{std::move(timer)} {}

    int getTime() {
        return timer.getTime();
    }
};

int main() {
    TimeKeeper keeper(Timer());
    return keeper.getTime();
}

The line TimeKeeper keeper(Timer()); is ambiguous: it could be interpreted either as

1. a variable definition for variable keeper of class TimeKeeper, initialized with an anonymous instance of class Timer or
2. a function declaration for a function keeper that returns an object of type TimeKeeper and has a single (unnamed) parameter, whose type is a (pointer to a) function (Note: According to C++ type decay rules, a function object declared as a parameter is equivalent to a pointer to a function of that type. See Function object#In C and C++.) taking no input and returning Timer objects.

The C++ standard requires the second interpretation, which is inconsistent with the subsequent line 13. For example, Clang++ warns that the most vexing parse has been applied on line 12 and errors on the subsequent line 13:

$ clang++ timekeeper.cc
timekeeper.cc:12:27: warning: parentheses were disambiguated as a function declaration [-Wvexing-parse]
  TimeKeeper keeper(Timer());
                        ^~~~~~~~~
timekeeper.cc:12:28: note: add a pair of parentheses to declare a variable
  TimeKeeper keeper(Timer());
                         ^
                         (      )
timekeeper.cc:13:23: error: member reference base type 'TimeKeeper (Timer (*)())' is not a structure or union
  return keeper.getTime();
         ~~~~~~~~~~~^~~~~~~~~
1 warning and 1 error generated.

== Solutions ==
The required interpretation of these ambiguous declarations is rarely the intended one. Function types in C++ are usually hidden behind typedefs and typically have an explicit reference or pointer qualifier. To force the alternate interpretation, the typical technique is a different object creation or conversion syntax.

In the type conversion example, there are two alternate syntaxes available for casts: the "C-style cast"

// A variable of type int is declared.
int i((int)x);

or a named cast:

int i(static_cast<int>(x));

Another syntax, also valid in C, is to use = when initializing variables:

int i = int(x);

In the variable declaration example, an alternate method (since C++11) is uniform (brace) initialization. This also allows limited omission of the type name entirely:

// Any of the following work:
TimeKeeper keeper(Timer{});
TimeKeeper keeper{Timer()};
TimeKeeper keeper{Timer{}};
TimeKeeper keeper({});
TimeKeeper keeper{{}};

Prior to C++11, the common techniques to force the intended interpretation were use of an extra parenthesis or copy-initialization:

TimeKeeper time_keeper( /*Avoid MVP*/ (Timer()) );
TimeKeeper time_keeper = TimeKeeper(Timer());

In the latter syntax, the copy-initialization is likely to be optimized out by the compiler. Since C++17, this optimization is guaranteed.
