= MSConfig =

System utility in Microsoft Windows

- Screenshot of MSConfig in Windows 11
- Other names: System Configuration; Microsoft System Configuration Utility
- Developer: Microsoft
- Operating system: Microsoft Windows
- Type: System utility

MSConfig (officially called System Configuration in Windows Vista, Windows 7, Windows 8, Windows 10, or Windows 11 and Microsoft System Configuration Utility in previous operating systems) is a system utility to troubleshoot the Microsoft Windows startup process. It can disable or re-enable software, device drivers and Windows services that run at startup, or change boot parameters.

It is bundled with all versions of Microsoft Windows operating systems since Windows 98 except Windows 2000. Windows 95 and Windows 2000 users can download the utility as well, although it was not designed for them.

== Uses ==
MSConfig is often used for speeding up the Microsoft Windows startup process of the machine. According to Microsoft, MSConfig was not meant to be used as a startup management program.

== Features ==
MSConfig is a troubleshooting tool which is used to temporarily disable or re-enable software, device drivers or Windows services that run during startup process to help the user determine the cause of a problem with Windows.

Some of its functionality varies by Windows versions:

- In Windows 98 and Windows Me, it can configure advanced troubleshooting settings pertaining to these operating systems. It can also launch common system tools.
- In Windows 98, it can back up and restore startup files.
- In Windows Me, it has also been updated with three new tabs called "Static VxDs", "Environment" and "International". The Static VxDs tab allows users to enable or disable static virtual device drivers to be loaded at startup, the Environment tab allows users to enable or disable environment variables, and the International tab allows users to set international language keyboard layout settings that were formerly set via the real-mode MS-DOS configuration files. A "Cleanup" button on the "Startup" tab allows cleaning up invalid or deleted startup entries.
- In Windows Me and Windows XP versions, it can restore an individual file from the original Windows installation set.
- On Windows NT-based operating systems prior to Windows Vista, it can set various BOOT.INI switches.
- In Windows XP and Windows Vista, it can hide all operating system services for troubleshooting.
- In Windows Vista and later, the tool allows configuring various switches for Windows Boot Manager and Boot Configuration Data. It also gained additional support for launching a variety of tools, such as system information, other configuration areas, such as Internet options, and the ability to enable/disable UAC. An update is available for Windows XP and Windows Server 2003 that adds the Tools tab.
