= Junia (naming tradition) =

Matrilineal naming convention

- Formation: 2025
- Founder: Tamara Nall
- Type: Cultural movement
- Legal status: Active
- Headquarters: Washington, D.C., United States
- Services: Naming ceremonies, certificates, advocacy for legal recognition
- Website: junialegacy.com

Junia (abbreviated Jn.) is the feminine equivalent of “Junior.” The naming convention functions in the same manner as the traditional use of “Junior,” except it applies to daughters who receive their mother’s exact full name first, middle, and last. The movement was founded in 2025 by Dr. Tamara Nall, an entrepreneur based in Washington, D.C.

== History ==
Nall founded Junia following the death of her mother, which prompted her to reflect on gender disparity in naming recognition.

== Naming tradition ==
A daughter who receives her mother’s exact full name first, middle, and last may use “Junia” or “Jn.” after her name, functioning as the feminine equivalent of “Junior.” Families may participate in a naming ceremony and obtain a certificate through the movement's website. The movement also provides a naming ceremony template for families to use.

== National Junia Day ==
March 1 is designated as National Junia Day, intended as an annual day of recognition for matriarchal naming legacy.

== Petition and advocacy ==
In June 2025, the movement launched a Change.org petition seeking formal recognition of "Junia (Jn.)" as a legal naming suffix equivalent to "Junior". The petition calls on lawmakers and cultural institutions to include the suffix on official name forms and identity documents.

Nall created Junia as a global matrilineal naming convention intended to formally recognize daughters who carry their mother’s exact full name.

== See also ==
- Matrilineality
- Naming convention
- Junior (suffix)
- Women's history
