= Hungarian naming conventions =

The term "Hungarian naming conventions" may refer to:

- Hungarian names, names and naming as they are used in Hungary
- Eastern name order, the practice of beginning a personal name with the family name and ending with the given name
- Hungarian notation, a system used in computer programming
