= Fortran 95 language features =

1995 edition of the Fortran programming language standard

This is an overview of Fortran 95 language features which is based upon the standards document which has been replaced by a newer version. Included are the additional features of TR-15581:Enhanced Data Type Facilities, which have been universally implemented. Old features that have been superseded by new ones are not described – few of those historic features are used in modern programs although most have been retained in the language to maintain backward compatibility. The additional features of subsequent standards, up to Fortran 2023, are described in the Fortran 2023 standard document, ISO/IEC 1539-1:2023. Some of its new features are still being implemented in compilers. Details can also be found in a range of textbooks, for instance and see the list at Fortran Resources. Sources for the description in the sections below can be found in the standards documents, textbooks as well as the Bibliography.

== Language elements ==
Fortran is case-insensitive. The convention of writing Fortran keywords in upper case and all other names in lower case is adopted in this article; except, by way of contrast, in the input/output descriptions (Data transfer and Operations on external files).

=== Basics ===
The basic component of the Fortran language is its character set. Its members are

- the letters A ... Z and a ... z (which are equivalent outside a character context)
- the numerals 0 ... 9
- the underscore _
- the special characters = : + blank - * / ( ) [ ] , . $ ' ! " % & ; < > ?

Tokens that have a syntactic meaning to the compiler are built from those components. There are six classes of tokens:

Label	123
Constant	123.456789_long
Keyword	ALLOCATABLE
Operator	.add.
Name	solve_equation (up to 31 characters, including _)
Separator	/ ( ) (/ /) [ ] , = => : :: ; %

From the tokens, statements are built. These can be coded using the new free source form which does not require positioning in a rigid column structure:

FUNCTION string_concat(s1, s2)                             ! This is a comment
   TYPE (string), INTENT(IN) :: s1, s2
   TYPE (string) string_concat
   string_concat%string_data = s1%string_data(1:s1%length) // &
      s2%string_data(1:s2%length)                          ! This is a continuation
   string_concat%length = s1%length + s2%length
END FUNCTION string_concat

Note the trailing comments and the trailing continuation mark. There may be 39 continuation lines, and 132 characters per line. Blanks are significant. Where a token or character constant is split across two lines:

               ...        start_of&
        &_name
               ...   'a very long &
        &string'

a leading & on the continued line is also required.

=== Intrinsic data types ===
Fortran has five intrinsic data types: INTEGER, REAL, COMPLEX, LOGICAL and CHARACTER. Each of those types can be additionally characterized by a kind. Kind, basically, defines internal representation of the type: for the three numeric types, it defines the precision and range, and for the other two, the specifics of storage representation. Thus, it is an abstract concept which models the limits of data types' representation; it is expressed as a member of a set of whole numbers (e.g. it may be {1, 2, 4, 8} for integers, denoting bytes of storage), but those values are not specified by the Standard and not portable. For every type, there is a default kind, which is used if no kind is explicitly specified. For each intrinsic type, there is a corresponding form of literal constant. The numeric types INTEGER and REAL can only be signed (there is no concept of sign for type COMPLEX).

==== Literal constants and kinds ====
===== INTEGER =====
Integer literal constants of the default kind take the form

1   0   -999   32767   +10

Kind can be defined as a named constant. If the desired range is ±10^{kind}, the portable syntax for defining the appropriate kind, two_bytes is

INTEGER, PARAMETER :: two_bytes = SELECTED_INT_KIND(4)

that allows subsequent definition of constants of the form

-1234_two_bytes   +1_two_bytes

Here, two_bytes is the kind type parameter; it can also be an explicit default integer literal constant, like

-1234_2

but such use is non-portable.

The KIND function supplies the value of a kind type parameter:

KIND(1)            KIND(1_two_bytes)

and the RANGE function supplies the actual decimal range (so the user must make the actual mapping to bytes):

RANGE(1_two_bytes)

Also, in DATA (initialization) statements, binary (B), octal (O) and hexadecimal (Z) constants may be used (often informally referred to as "BOZ constants"):

B'01010101'   O'01234567'   Z'10fa'

===== REAL =====
There are at least two real kinds – the default and one with greater precision (this replaces DOUBLE PRECISION). SELECTED_REAL_KIND functions returns the kind number for desired range and precision; for at least 9 decimal digits of precision and a range of 10^{−99} to 10^{99}, it can be specified as:

INTEGER, PARAMETER :: long = SELECTED_REAL_KIND(9, 99)

and literals subsequently specified as

1.7_long

Also, there are the intrinsic functions

KIND(1.7_long)   PRECISION(1.7_long)   RANGE(1.7_long)

that give in turn the kind type value, the actual precision (here at least 9), and the actual range (here at least 99).

===== COMPLEX =====
COMPLEX data type is built of two integer or real components:

(1, 3.7_long)

===== LOGICAL =====
There are only two basic values of logical constants: .TRUE. and .FALSE.. Here, there may also be different kinds. Logicals don't have their own kind inquiry functions, but use the kinds specified for INTEGERs; default kind of LOGICAL is the same as of INTEGER.

.FALSE.   .true._one_byte

and the KIND function operates as expected:

KIND(.TRUE.)

===== CHARACTER =====
The forms of literal constants for CHARACTER data type are

'A string'   "Another"   'A "quote"'   '''''''

(the last being an empty string). Different kinds are allowed (for example, to distinguish ASCII and UNICODE strings), but not widely supported by compilers. Again, the kind value is given by the KIND function:

KIND('ASCII')

==== Number model and intrinsic functions ====
The numeric types are based on number models with associated inquiry functions (whose values are independent of the values of their arguments; arguments are used only to provide kind). These functions are important for portable numerical software:

DIGITS(X)	Number of significant digits
EPSILON(X)	Almost negligible compared to one (real)
HUGE(X)	Largest number
MAXEXPONENT(X)	Maximum model exponent (real)
MINEXPONENT(X)	Minimum model exponent (real)
PRECISION(X)	Decimal precision (real, complex)
RADIX(X)	Base of the model
RANGE(X)	Decimal exponent range
TINY(X)	Smallest positive number (real)

=== Scalar variables ===
Scalar variables corresponding to the five intrinsic types are specified as follows:

INTEGER(KIND=2) :: i
REAL(KIND=long) :: a
COMPLEX         :: current
LOGICAL         :: Pravda
CHARACTER(LEN=20) :: word
CHARACTER(LEN=2, KIND=Kanji) :: kanji_word

where the optional KIND parameter specifies a non-default kind, and the :: notation delimits the type and attributes from variable name(s) and their optional initial values, allowing full variable specification and initialization to be typed in one statement (in previous standards, attributes and initializers had to be declared in several statements). While it is not required in above examples (as there are no additional attributes and initialization), most Fortran-90 programmers acquire the habit to use it everywhere.

LEN= specifier is applicable only to CHARACTERs and specifies the string length (replacing the older *len form). The explicit KIND= and LEN= specifiers are optional:

CHARACTER(2, Kanji) :: kanji_word

works just as well.

There are some other interesting character features. Just as a substring as in

CHARACTER(80) :: line   
... = line(i:i)                     ! substring

was previously possible, so now is the substring

'0123456789'(i:i)

Also, zero-length strings are allowed:

line(i:i-1)       ! zero-length string

Finally, there is a set of intrinsic character functions, examples being

ACHAR	IACHAR (for ASCII set)
ADJUSTL	ADJUSTR
LEN_TRIM	INDEX(s1, s2, BACK=.TRUE.)
REPEAT	SCAN(for one of a set)
TRIM	VERIFY(for all of a set)

=== Derived data types ===
For derived data types, the form of the type must be defined first:

TYPE person
   CHARACTER(10) name
   REAL          age
END TYPE person

and then, variables of that type can be defined:

TYPE(person) you, me

To select components of a derived type, % qualifier is used:

you%age

Literal constants of derived types have the form TypeName(1stComponentLiteral, 2ndComponentLiteral, ...):

you = person('Smith', 23.5)

which is known as a structure constructor. Definitions may refer to a previously defined type:

TYPE point
   REAL x, y
END TYPE point
TYPE triangle
   TYPE(point) a, b, c
END TYPE triangle

and for a variable of type triangle, as in

TYPE(triangle) t

each component of type point is accessed as

t%a   t%b   t%c

which, in turn, have ultimate components of type real:

t%a%x   t%a%y   t%b%x   etc.

(Note that the % qualifier was chosen rather than dot (.) because of potential ambiguity with operator notation, like .OR.).

=== Implicit and explicit typing ===
Unless specified otherwise, all variables starting with letters I, J, K, L, M and N are default INTEGERs, and all others are default REAL; other data types must be explicitly declared. This is known as implicit typing and is a heritage of early FORTRAN days. Those defaults can be overridden by IMPLICIT TypeName (CharacterRange) statements, like:

IMPLICIT COMPLEX(Z)
IMPLICIT CHARACTER(A-B)
IMPLICIT REAL(C-H,N-Y)

However, it is a good practice to explicitly type all variables, and this can be forced by inserting the statement IMPLICIT NONE at the beginning of each program unit.

=== Arrays ===
Arrays are considered to be variables in their own right. Every array is characterized by its type, rank, and shape (which defines the extents of each dimension). Bounds of each dimension are by default 1 and size, but arbitrary bounds can be explicitly specified. DIMENSION keyword is optional and considered an attribute; if omitted, the array shape must be specified after array-variable name. For example,

REAL:: a(10)
INTEGER, DIMENSION(0:100, -50:50) :: map

declares two arrays, rank-1 and rank-2, whose elements are in column-major order. Elements are, for example,

a(1)  a(i*j)

and are scalars. The subscripts may be any scalar integer expression.

Sections are parts of the array variables, and are arrays themselves:

a(i:j)               ! rank one
map(i:j, k:l:m)      ! rank two
a(map(i, k:l))       ! vector subscript
a(3:2)               ! zero length

Whole arrays and array sections are array-valued objects. Array-valued constants (constructors) are available, enclosed in (/ ... /):

(/ 1, 2, 3, 4 /)
(/ ( (/ 1, 2, 3 /), i = 1, 4) /)
(/ (i, i = 1, 9, 2) /)
(/ (0, i = 1, 100) /)
(/ (0.1*i, i = 1, 10) /)

making use of an implied-DO loop notation. Fortran 2003 allows the use of brackets: [1, 2, 3, 4] and [([1,2,3], i=1,4)] instead of the first two examples above, and many compilers support this now. A derived data type may, of course, contain array components:

TYPE triplet
   REAL, DIMENSION(3) :: vertex
END TYPE triplet
TYPE(triplet), DIMENSION(4) :: t

so that

- t(2) is a scalar (a structure)
- t(2)%vertex is an array component of a scalar

=== Data initialization ===
Variables can be given initial values as specified in a specification statement:

REAL, DIMENSION(3) :: a = (/ 0.1, 0.2, 0.3 /)

and a default initial value can be given to the component of a derived data type:

TYPE triplet
   REAL, DIMENSION(3) :: vertex = 0.0
END TYPE triplet

When local variables are initialized within a procedure they implicitly acquire the SAVE attribute:

REAL, DIMENSION(3) :: point = (/ 0.0, 1.0, -1.0 /)

This declaration is equivalent to

REAL, DIMENSION(3), SAVE :: point = (/ 0.0, 1.0, -1.0 /)

for local variables within a subroutine or function. The SAVE attribute causes local variables to retain their value after a procedure call and then to initialize the variable to the saved value upon returning to the procedure.

==== PARAMETER attribute ====
A named constant can be specified directly by adding the PARAMETER attribute and the constant values to a type statement:

REAL, DIMENSION(3), PARAMETER :: field = (/ 0., 1., 2. /)
TYPE(triplet), PARAMETER :: t = triplet( (/ 0., 0., 0. /) )

==== DATA statement ====
The DATA statement can be used for scalars and also for arrays and variables of derived type. It is also the only way to initialise just parts of such objects, as well as to initialise to binary, octal or hexadecimal values:

TYPE(triplet) :: t1, t2
DATA t1/triplet( (/ 0., 1., 2. /) )/, t2%vertex(1)/123./
DATA array(1:64) / 64*0/
DATA i, j, k/ B'01010101', O'77', Z'ff'/

==== Initialization expressions ====
The values used in DATA and PARAMETER statements, or with these attributes, are constant expressions that may include references to: array and structure constructors, elemental intrinsic functions with integer or character arguments and results, and the six transformational functions REPEAT, SELECTED_INT_KIND, TRIM, SELECTED_REAL_KIND, RESHAPE and TRANSFER (see Intrinsic procedures):

INTEGER, PARAMETER :: long = SELECTED_REAL_KIND(12),   &
                      array(3) = (/ 1, 2, 3 /)

=== Specification expressions ===
It is possible to specify details of variables using any non-constant, scalar, integer expression that may also include inquiry function references:

SUBROUTINE s(b, m, c)
   USE mod                                 ! contains a
   REAL, DIMENSION(:, :)             :: b
   REAL, DIMENSION(UBOUND(b, 1) + 5) :: x
   INTEGER                           :: m
   CHARACTER(LEN=*)                  :: c
   CHARACTER(LEN= m + LEN(c))        :: cc
   REAL (SELECTED_REAL_KIND(2*PRECISION(a))) :: z

== Expressions and assignments ==
=== Scalar numeric ===
The usual arithmetic operators are available – +, -, *, /, ** (given here in increasing order of precedence).

Parentheses are used to indicate the order of evaluation where necessary:

a*b + c     ! * first
a*(b + c)   ! + first

The rules for scalar numeric expressions and assignments accommodate the non-default kinds. Thus, the mixed-mode numeric expression and assignment rules incorporate different kind type parameters in an expected way:

real2 = integer0 + real1

converts integer0 to a real value of the same kind as real1; the result is of same kind, and is converted to the kind of real2 for assignment.

These functions are available for controlled rounding of real numbers to integers:

- NINT: round to nearest integer, return integer result
- ANINT: round to nearest integer, return real result
- INT: truncate (round towards zero), return integer result
- AINT: truncate (round towards zero), return real result
- CEILING: smallest integral value not less than argument (round up) (Fortran-90)
- FLOOR: largest integral value not greater than argument (round down) (Fortran-90)

=== Scalar relational operations ===
For scalar relational operations of numeric types, there is a set of built-in operators:

<    <=    ==   /=   >   >=
.LT. .LE. .EQ. .NE. .GT. .GE.

(the forms above are new to Fortran-90, and older equivalent forms are given below them). Example expressions:

a < b .AND. i /= j      ! for numeric variables
flag = a == b           ! for logical variable flags

=== Scalar characters ===
In the case of scalar characters and given CHARACTER(8) result

it is legal to write

result(3:5) = result(1:3)    ! overlap allowed
result(3:3) = result(3:2)    ! no assignment of null string

Concatenation is performed by the operator '//'.

result = 'abcde'//'123'
filename = result//'.dat'

=== Derived-data types ===
No built-in operations (except assignment, defined on component-by component basis) exist between derived data types mutually or with intrinsic types. The meaning of existing or user-specified operators can be (re)defined though:

TYPE string80
   INTEGER       length
   CHARACTER(80) value
END TYPE string80
CHARACTER::    char1, char2, char3
TYPE(string80):: str1,  str2,  str3

we can write

str3  = str1//str2       ! must define operation
str3  = str1.concat.str2 ! must define operation
char3 = char2//char3     ! intrinsic operator only
str3  = char1            ! must define assignment

Notice the "overloaded" use of the intrinsic symbol // and the named operator, .concat. . A difference between the two cases is that, for an intrinsic operator token, the usual precedence rules apply, whereas for named operators, precedence is the highest as a unary operator or the lowest as a binary one. In

vector3 = matrix    *    vector1  + vector2
vector3 =(matrix .times. vector1) + vector2

the two expressions are equivalent only if appropriate parentheses are added as shown. In each case there must be defined, in a module, procedures defining the operator and assignment, and corresponding operator-procedure association, as follows:

INTERFACE OPERATOR(//) !Overloads the // operator as invoking string_concat procedure
  MODULE PROCEDURE string_concat
END INTERFACE

The string concatenation function is a more elaborated version of that shown already in Basics. Note that in order to handle the error condition that arises when the two strings together exceed the preset 80-character limit, it would be safer to use a subroutine to perform the concatenation (in this case operator-overloading would not be applicable.)

MODULE string_type
   IMPLICIT NONE
   TYPE string80
      INTEGER length
      CHARACTER(LEN=80)   :: string_data
   END TYPE string80
   INTERFACE ASSIGNMENT(=)
      MODULE PROCEDURE c_to_s_assign, s_to_c_assign
   END INTERFACE
   INTERFACE OPERATOR(//)
      MODULE PROCEDURE string_concat
   END INTERFACE
CONTAINS
   SUBROUTINE c_to_s_assign(s, c)
      TYPE (string80), INTENT(OUT)    :: s
      CHARACTER(LEN=*), INTENT(IN)  :: c
      s%string_data = c
      s%length = LEN(c)
   END SUBROUTINE c_to_s_assign
   SUBROUTINE s_to_c_assign(c, s)
      TYPE (string80), INTENT(IN)     :: s
      CHARACTER(LEN=*), INTENT(OUT) :: c
      c = s%string_data(1:s%length)
   END SUBROUTINE s_to_c_assign
   TYPE(string80) FUNCTION string_concat(s1, s2)
      TYPE(string80), INTENT(IN) :: s1, s2
      TYPE(string80) :: s
      INTEGER :: n1, n2
      CHARACTER(160) :: ctot
      n1 = LEN_TRIM(s1%string_data)
      n2 = LEN_TRIM(s2%string_data)
      IF (n1+n2 <= 80) then
         s%string_data = s1%string_data(1:n1)//s2%string_data(1:n2)
      ELSE  ! This is an error condition which should be handled - for now just truncate
         ctot = s1%string_data(1:n1)//s2%string_data(1:n2)
         s%string_data = ctot(1:80)
      END IF
      s%length = LEN_TRIM(s%string_data)
      string_concat = s
   END FUNCTION string_concat
END MODULE string_type

PROGRAM main
   USE string_type
   TYPE(string80) :: s1, s2, s3
   CALL c_to_s_assign(s1,'My name is')
   CALL c_to_s_assign(s2,' Linus Torvalds')
   s3 = s1//s2
   WRITE(*,*) 'Result: ',s3%string_data
   WRITE(*,*) 'Length: ',s3%length
END PROGRAM

Defined operators such as these are required for the expressions that are allowed also in structure constructors (see Derived-data types):

str1 = string(2, char1//char2)  ! structure constructor

=== Arrays ===
In the case of arrays then, as long as they are of the same shape (conformable), operations and assignments are extended in an obvious way, on an element-by-element basis. For example, given declarations of

REAL, DIMENSION(10, 20) :: a, b, c
REAL, DIMENSION(5)      :: v, w
LOGICAL                    flag(10, 20)

it can be written:

a = b                                       ! whole array assignment
c = a/b                                     ! whole array division and assignment
c = 0.                                      ! whole array assignment of scalar value
w = v + 1.                                  ! whole array addition to scalar value
w = 5/v + a(1:5, 5)                         ! array division, and addition to section
flag = a==b                                 ! whole array relational test and assignment
c(1:8, 5:10) = a(2:9, 5:10) + b(1:8, 15:20) ! array section addition and assignment
v(2:5) = v(1:4)                             ! overlapping section assignment

The order of expression evaluation is not specified in order to allow for optimization on parallel and vector machines. Of course, any operators for arrays of derived type must be defined.

Some real intrinsic functions that are useful for numeric computations are

- CEILING
- FLOOR
- MODULO (also integer)
- EXPONENT
- FRACTION
- NEAREST
- RRSPACING
- SPACING
- SCALE
- SET_EXPONENT

These are array valued for array arguments (elemental), like all FORTRAN 77 functions (except LEN):

- INT
- REAL
- CMPLX
- AINT
- ANINT
- NINT
- ABS
- MOD
- SIGN
- DIM
- MAX
- MIN

Powers, logarithms, and trigonometric functions

- SQRT
- EXP
- LOG
- LOG10
- SIN
- COS
- TAN
- ASIN
- ACOS
- ATAN
- ATAN2
- SINH
- COSH
- TANH

Complex numbers:

- AIMAG
- CONJG

The following are for characters:

- LGE
- LGT
- LLE
- LLT
- ICHAR
- CHAR
- INDEX

== Control statements ==
=== Branching and conditions ===
The simple GO TO label exists, but is usually avoided – in most cases, a more specific branching construct will accomplish the same logic with more clarity.

The simple conditional test is the IF statement: IF (a > b) x = y

A full-blown IF construct is illustrated by

IF (i < 0) THEN
   IF (j < 0) THEN
      x = 0.
   ELSE
      z = 0.
   END IF
ELSE IF (k < 0) THEN
   z = 1.
ELSE
   x = 1.
END IF

=== CASE construct ===
The CASE construct is a replacement for the computed GOTO, but is better structured and does not require the use of statement labels:

SELECT CASE (number)       ! number of type integer
CASE (:-1)                 ! all values below 0
   n_sign = -1
CASE (0)                   ! only 0
   n_sign = 0
CASE (1:)                  ! all values above 0
   n_sign = 1
END SELECT

Each CASE selector list may contain a list and/or range of integers, character or logical constants, whose values may not overlap within or between selectors:

CASE (1, 2, 7, 10:17, 23)

A default is available:

CASE DEFAULT

There is only one evaluation, and only one match.

=== DO construct ===
A simplified but sufficient form of the DO construct is illustrated by

outer: DO
inner:    DO i = j, k, l      ! from j to k in steps of l (l is optional)
             :
             IF (...) CYCLE
             :
             IF (...) EXIT outer
             :
          END DO inner
       END DO outer

where we note that loops may be optionally named so that any EXIT or CYCLE statement may specify which loop is meant.

Many, but not all, simple loops can be replaced by array expressions and assignments, or by new intrinsic functions. For instance

tot = 0.
DO i = m, n
   tot = tot + a(i)
END DO

becomes simply tot = SUM( a(m:n) )

== Program units and procedures ==
=== Definitions ===
In order to discuss this topic we need some definitions. In logical terms, an executable program consists of one main program and zero or more subprograms (or procedures) - these do something. Subprograms are either functions or subroutines, which are either external, internal or module subroutines. (External subroutines are what we knew from FORTRAN 77.)

From an organizational point of view, however, a complete program consists of program units. These are either main programs, external subprograms or modules and can be separately compiled.

An example of a main (and complete) program is

PROGRAM test
   PRINT *, 'Hello world!'
END PROGRAM test

An example of a main program and an external subprogram, forming an executable program, is

PROGRAM test
   CALL print_message
END PROGRAM test
SUBROUTINE print_message
   PRINT *, 'Hello world!'
END SUBROUTINE print_message

The form of a function is

FUNCTION name(arg1, arg2) ! zero or more arguments
   :                     
   name = ...
   :
END FUNCTION name

The form of reference of a function is x = name(a, b)

=== Internal procedures ===
An internal subprogram is one contained in another (at a maximum of one level of nesting) and provides a replacement for the statement function:

SUBROUTINE outer
   REAL x, y
   :
CONTAINS
   SUBROUTINE inner
      REAL y
      y = x + 1.
      :
   END SUBROUTINE inner     ! SUBROUTINE mandatory
END SUBROUTINE outer

We say that outer is the host of inner, and that inner obtains access to entities in outer by host association (e.g. to x), whereas y is a local variable to inner.

The scope of a named entity is a scoping unit, here outer less inner, and inner.

The names of program units and external procedures are global, and the names of implied-DO variables have a scope of the statement that contains them.

=== Modules ===
Modules are used to package

- global data (replaces COMMON and BLOCK DATA from Fortran 77);
- type definitions (themselves a scoping unit);
- subprograms (which among other things replaces the use of ENTRY from Fortran 77);
- interface blocks (another scoping unit, see Interface blocks);
- namelist groups (see any textbook).

An example of a module containing a type definition, interface block and function subprogram is

MODULE interval_arithmetic
   TYPE interval
      REAL lower, upper
   END TYPE interval
   INTERFACE OPERATOR(+)
       MODULE PROCEDURE add_intervals
   END INTERFACE
   :
CONTAINS
   FUNCTION add_intervals(a,b)
      TYPE(interval), INTENT(IN) :: a, b
      TYPE(interval) add_intervals
      add_intervals%lower = a%lower + b%lower
      add_intervals%upper = a%upper + b%upper
   END FUNCTION add_intervals             ! FUNCTION mandatory
   :
END MODULE interval_arithmetic

and the simple statement

     
USE interval_arithmetic

provides use association to all the module's entities. Module subprograms may, in turn, contain internal subprograms.

=== Controlling accessibility ===
The PUBLIC and PRIVATE attributes are used in specifications in modules to limit the scope of entities. The attribute form is

REAL, PUBLIC     :: x, y, z           ! default
INTEGER, PRIVATE :: u, v, w

and the statement form is

PUBLIC  :: x, y, z, OPERATOR(.add.)
PRIVATE :: u, v, w, ASSIGNMENT(=), OPERATOR(*)

The statement form has to be used to limit access to operators, and can also be used to change the overall default:

PRIVATE                        ! sets default for module
PUBLIC  :: only_this

For derived types there are three possibilities: the type and its components are all PUBLIC, the type is PUBLIC and its components PRIVATE (the type only is visible and one can change its details easily), or all of it is PRIVATE (for internal use in the module only):

MODULE mine
   PRIVATE
   TYPE, PUBLIC :: list
      REAL x, y
      TYPE(list), POINTER :: next
   END TYPE list
   TYPE(list) :: tree
   :
END MODULE mine

The USE statement's purpose is to gain access to entities in a module. It has options to resolve name clashes if an imported name is the same as a local one:

USE mine, local_list => list

or to restrict the used entities to a specified set:

USE mine, ONLY : list

These may be combined:

USE mine, ONLY : local_list => list

=== Arguments ===
We may specify the intent of dummy arguments:

SUBROUTINE shuffle (ncards, cards)
  INTEGER, INTENT(IN)  :: ncards
  INTEGER, INTENT(OUT), DIMENSION(ncards) :: cards

Also, INOUT is possible: here the actual argument must be a variable (unlike the default case where it may be a constant).

Arguments may be optional:

SUBROUTINE mincon(n, f, x, upper, lower, equalities, inequalities, convex, xstart)
   REAL, OPTIONAL, DIMENSION :: upper, lower
   :
   IF (PRESENT(lower)) THEN   ! test for presence of actual argument
   :

allows us to call mincon by

CALL mincon (n, f, x, upper)

Arguments may be keyword rather than positional (which come first):

CALL mincon(n, f, x, equalities=0, xstart=x0)

Optional and keyword arguments are handled by explicit interfaces, that is with internal or module procedures or with interface blocks.

=== Interface blocks ===
Any reference to an internal or module subprogram is through an interface that is 'explicit' (that is, the compiler can see all the details). A reference to an external (or dummy) procedure is usually 'implicit' (the compiler assumes the details). However, we can provide an explicit interface in this case too. It is a copy of the header, specifications and END statement of the procedure concerned, either placed in a module or inserted directly:

REAL FUNCTION minimum(a, b, func)
  ! returns the minimum value of the function func(x)
  ! in the interval (a,b)
  REAL, INTENT(in) :: a, b
  INTERFACE
    REAL FUNCTION func(x)
      REAL, INTENT(IN) :: x
    END FUNCTION func
  END INTERFACE
  REAL f,x
  :
  f = func(x)   ! invocation of the user function.
  :
END FUNCTION minimum

An explicit interface is obligatory for

- optional and keyword arguments;
- POINTER and TARGET arguments (see Pointers);
- POINTER function result;
- new-style array arguments and array functions (Array handling).

It allows full checks at compile time between actual and dummy arguments.

In general, the best way to ensure that a procedure interface is explicit is either to place the procedure concerned in a module or to use it as an internal procedure.

=== Overloading and generic interfaces ===
Interface blocks provide the mechanism by which we are able to define generic names for specific procedures:

INTERFACE gamma                   ! generic name
   FUNCTION sgamma(X)              ! specific name
      REAL (SELECTED_REAL_KIND( 6)) sgamma, x
   END
   FUNCTION dgamma(X)              ! specific name
      REAL (SELECTED_REAL_KIND(12)) dgamma, x
   END
END INTERFACE

where a given set of specific names corresponding to a generic name must all be of functions or all of subroutines. If this interface is within a module, then it is simply

INTERFACE gamma
   MODULE PROCEDURE sgamma, dgamma
END INTERFACE

We can use existing names, e.g. SIN, and the compiler sorts out the correct association.

We have already seen the use of interface blocks for defined operators and assignment (see Modules).

=== Recursion ===
Indirect recursion is useful for multi-dimensional integration. For

volume = integrate(fy, ybounds)

We might have

RECURSIVE FUNCTION integrate(f, bounds)
   ! Integrate f(x) from bounds(1) to bounds(2)
   REAL integrate
   INTERFACE
      FUNCTION f(x)
         REAL f, x
      END FUNCTION f
   END INTERFACE
   REAL, DIMENSION(2), INTENT(IN) :: bounds
   :
END FUNCTION integrate

and to integrate f(x, y) over a rectangle:

FUNCTION fy(y)
   USE func           ! module func contains function f
   REAL fy, y
   yval = y
   fy = integrate(f, xbounds)
END

Direct recursion is when a procedure calls itself, as in

RECURSIVE FUNCTION factorial(n) RESULT(res)
   INTEGER res, n
   IF(n.EQ.0) THEN
      res = 1
   ELSE
      res = n*factorial(n-1)
   END IF
END

Here, we note the RESULT clause and termination test.

=== Pure procedures ===
This is a feature for parallel computing.

In the FORALL statement and construct, any side effects in a function can impede optimization on a parallel processor – the order of execution of the assignments could affect the results. To control this situation, we add the PURE keyword to the SUBROUTINE or FUNCTION statement – an assertion that the procedure (expressed simply):

- alters no global variable,
- performs no I/O,
- has no saved variables (variables with the SAVE attribute that retains values between invocations), and
- for functions, does not alter any of its arguments.

A compiler can check that this is the case, as in

PURE FUNCTION calculate (x)

All the intrinsic functions are pure.

== Array handling ==
Array handling is included in Fortran for two main reasons:

- the notational convenience it provides, bringing the code closer to the underlying mathematical form;
- for the additional optimization opportunities it gives compilers (although there are plenty of opportunities for degrading optimization too!).

At the same time, major extensions of the functionality in this area have been added. We have already met whole arrays above #Arrays 1 and here #Arrays 2 - now we develop the theme.

=== Zero-sized arrays ===
A zero-sized array is handled by Fortran as a legitimate object, without special coding by the programmer. Thus, in

DO i = 1,n
   x(i) = b(i) / a(i, i)
   b(i+1:n) = b(i+1:n) - a(i+1:n, i) * x(i)
END DO

no special code is required for the final iteration where i = n. We note that a zero-sized array is regarded as being defined; however, an array of shape (0,2) is not conformable with one of shape (0,3), whereas x(1:0) = 3 is a valid 'do nothing' statement.

=== Assumed-shape arrays ===
These are an extension and replacement for assumed-size arrays. Given an actual argument like:

REAL, DIMENSION(0:10, 0:20) :: a
   :
CALL sub(a)

the corresponding dummy argument specification defines only the type and rank of the array, not its shape. This information has to be made available by an explicit interface, often using an interface block (see Interface blocks). Thus we write just

SUBROUTINE sub(da)
   REAL, DIMENSION(:, :) :: da

and this is as if da were dimensioned (11,21). However, we can specify any lower bound and the array maps accordingly.

REAL, DIMENSION(0:, 0:) :: da

The shape, not bounds, is passed, where the default lower bound is 1 and the default upper bound is the corresponding extent.

=== Automatic arrays ===
A partial replacement for the uses to which EQUIVALENCE was put is provided by this facility, useful for local, temporary arrays, as in

SUBROUTINE swap(a, b)
   REAL, DIMENSION(:)       :: a, b
   REAL, DIMENSION(SIZE(a)) :: work
   work = a
   a = b
   b = work
END SUBROUTINE swap

The actual storage is typically maintained on a stack.

=== ALLOCATABLE and ALLOCATE ===
Fortran provides dynamic allocation of storage; it relies on a heap storage mechanism (and replaces another use of EQUIVALENCE). An example for establishing a work array for a whole program is

MODULE work_array
   INTEGER n
   REAL, DIMENSION(:,:,:), ALLOCATABLE :: work
END MODULE
PROGRAM main
   USE work_array
   READ (input, *) n
   ALLOCATE(work(n, 2*n, 3*n), STAT=status)
   :
   DEALLOCATE (work)

The work array can be propagated through the whole program via a USE statement in each program unit. We may specify an explicit lower bound and allocate several entities in one statement. To free dead storage we write, for instance,

DEALLOCATE(a, b)

Deallocation of arrays is automatic when they go out of scope.

=== Elemental operations, assignments and procedures ===
We have already met whole array assignments and operations:

REAL, DIMENSION(10) :: a, b
a = 0.          ! scalar broadcast; elemental assignment
b = SQRT(a)     ! intrinsic function result as array object

In the second assignment, an intrinsic function returns an array-valued result for an array-valued argument. We can write array-valued functions ourselves (they require an explicit interface):

PROGRAM test
   REAL, DIMENSION(3) :: a = (/ 1., 2., 3./),       &
                         b = (/ 2., 2., 2. /),  r
   r = f(a, b)
   PRINT *, r
CONTAINS
   FUNCTION f(c, d)
   REAL, DIMENSION(:) :: c, d
   REAL, DIMENSION(SIZE(c)) :: f
   f = c*d        ! (or some more useful function of c and d)
   END FUNCTION f
END PROGRAM test

Elemental procedures are specified with scalar dummy arguments that may be called with array actual arguments. In the case of a function, the shape of the result is the shape of the array arguments.

Most intrinsic functions are elemental and Fortran 95 extends this feature to non-intrinsic procedures, thus providing the effect of writing, in Fortran 90, 22 different versions, for ranks 0-0, 0-1, 1-0, 1-1, 0-2, 2-0, 2-2, ... 7-7, and is further an aid to optimization on parallel processors. An elemental procedure must be pure.

ELEMENTAL SUBROUTINE swap(a, b)
   REAL, INTENT(INOUT)  :: a, b
   REAL                 :: work
   work = a
   a = b
   b = work
END SUBROUTINE swap

The dummy arguments cannot be used in specification expressions (see above) except as arguments to certain intrinsic functions (BIT_SIZE, KIND, LEN, and the numeric inquiry ones, (see below).

=== WHERE ===
Often, we need to mask an assignment. This we can do using the WHERE, either as a statement:

WHERE (a /= 0.0) a = 1.0/a  ! avoid division by 0

(note: the test is element-by-element, not on whole array), or as a construct:

WHERE (a /= 0.0)
   a = 1.0/a
   b = a             ! all arrays same shape
END WHERE

or

WHERE (a /= 0.0)
   a = 1.0/a
ELSEWHERE
   a = HUGE(a)
END WHERE

Further:

- it is permitted to mask not only the WHERE statement of the WHERE construct, but also any ELSEWHERE statement that it contains;
- a WHERE construct may contain any number of masked ELSEWHERE statements but at most one ELSEWHERE statement without a mask, and that must be the final one;
- WHERE constructs may be nested within one another, just FORALL constructs;
- a WHERE assignment statement is permitted to be a defined assignment, provided that it is elemental;
- a WHERE construct may be named in the same way as other constructs.

=== The FORALL statement and construct ===
When a DO construct is executed, each successive iteration is performed in order and one after the other – an impediment to optimization on a parallel processor.

FORALL(i = 1:n) a(i, i) = x(i)

where the individual assignments may be carried out in any order, and even simultaneously. The FORALL may be considered to be an array assignment expressed with the help of indices.

FORALL(i=1:n, j=1:n, y(i,j)/=0.) x(j,i) = 1.0/y(i,j)

with masking condition.

The FORALL construct allows several assignment statements to be executed in order.

a(2:n-1,2:n-1) = a(2:n-1,1:n-2) + a(2:n-1,3:n) + a(1:n-2,2:n-1) + a(3:n,2:n-1)
b(2:n-1,2:n-1) = a(2:n-1,2:n-1)

is equivalent to the array assignments

FORALL(i = 2:n-1, j = 2:n-1)
   a(i,j) = a(i,j-1) + a(i,j+1) + a(i-1,j) + a(i+1,j)
   b(i,j) = a(i,j)
END FORALL

The FORALL version is more readable.

Assignment in a FORALL is like an array assignment: as if all the expressions were evaluated in any order, held in temporary storage, then all the assignments performed in any order. The first statement must fully complete before the second can begin.

A FORALL may be nested, and may include a WHERE. Procedures referenced within a FORALL must be pure.

=== Array elements ===
For a simple case, given

REAL, DIMENSION(100, 100) :: a

we can reference a single element as, for instance, a(1, 1). For a derived-data type like

TYPE fun_del
   REAL                  u
   REAL, DIMENSION(3) :: du
END TYPE fun_del

we can declare an array of that type:

TYPE(fun_del), DIMENSION(10, 20) :: tar

and a reference like tar(n, 2) is an element (a scalar!) of type fun_del, but tar(n, 2)%du is an array of type real, and tar(n, 2)%du(2) is an element of it. The basic rule to remember is that an array element always has a subscript or subscripts qualifying at least the last name.

=== Array subobjects (sections) ===
The general form of subscript for an array section is

      [lower] : [upper] [:stride]

(where [ ] indicates an optional item) as in

REAL a(10, 10)
a(i, 1:n)                ! part of one row
a(1:m, j)                ! part of one column
a(i, : )                 ! whole row
a(i, 1:n:3)              ! every third element of row
a(i, 10:1:-1)            ! row in reverse order
a( (/ 1, 7, 3, 2 /), 1)  ! vector subscript
a(1, 2:11:2)             ! 11 is legal as not referenced
a(:, 1:7)                ! rank two section

Note that a vector subscript with duplicate values cannot appear on the left-hand side of an assignment as it would be ambiguous. Thus,

b( (/ 1, 7, 3, 7 /) ) = (/ 1, 2, 3, 4 /)

is illegal. Also, a section with a vector subscript must not be supplied as an actual argument to an OUT or INOUT dummy argument. Arrays of arrays are not allowed:

tar%du             ! illegal

We note that a given value in an array can be referenced both as an element and as a section:

a(1, 1)            !  scalar (rank zero)
a(1:1, 1)          !  array section (rank one)

depending on the circumstances or requirements. By qualifying objects of derived type, we obtain elements or sections depending on the rule stated earlier:

tar%u              !  array section (structure component)
tar(1, 1)%u        !  component of an array element

=== Arrays intrinsic functions ===
Vector and matrix multiply

DOT_PRODUCT	Dot product of 2 rank-one arrays
MATMUL	Matrix multiplication

Array reduction

ALL	True if all values are true
ANY	True if any value is true. Example: IF (ANY( a > b)) THEN
COUNT	Number of true elements in array
MAXVAL	Maximum value in an array
MINVAL	Minimum value in an array
PRODUCT	Product of array elements
SUM	Sum of array elements

Array inquiry

ALLOCATED	Array allocation status
LBOUND	Lower dimension bounds of an array
SHAPE	Shape of an array (or scalar)
SIZE	Total number of elements in an array
UBOUND	Upper dimension bounds of an array

Array construction

MERGE	Merge under mask
PACK	Pack an array into an array of rank one under a mask
SPREAD	Replicate array by adding a dimension
UNPACK	Unpack an array of rank one into an array under mask

Array reshape

RESHAPE	Reshape an array

Array manipulation

CSHIFT	Circular shift
EOSHIFT	End-off shift
TRANSPOSE	Transpose of an array of rank two

Array location

MAXLOC	Location of first maximum value in an array
MINLOC	Location of first minimum value in an array

== Pointers ==
=== Basics ===
Pointers are variables with the POINTER attribute; they are not a distinct data type (and so no 'pointer arithmetic' is possible).

REAL, POINTER :: var

They are conceptually a descriptor listing the attributes of the objects (targets) that the pointer may point to, and the address, if any, of a target. They have no associated storage until it is allocated or otherwise associated (by pointer assignment, see below):

ALLOCATE (var)

and they are dereferenced automatically, so no special symbol required. In

var = var + 2.3

the value of the target of var is used and modified. Pointers cannot be transferred via I/O. The statement

WRITE *, var

writes the value of the target of var and not the pointer descriptor itself.

A pointer can point to another pointer, and hence to its target, or to a static object that has the TARGET attribute:

REAL, POINTER :: object
REAL, TARGET  :: target_obj
var => object                  ! pointer assignment
var => target_obj

but they are strongly typed:

INTEGER, POINTER :: int_var
var => int_var                 ! illegal - types must match

and, similarly, for arrays the ranks as well as the type must agree.

A pointer can be a component of a derived type:

TYPE entry                       ! type for sparse matrix
   REAL :: value
   INTEGER :: index
   TYPE(entry), POINTER :: next  ! note recursion
END TYPE entry

and we can define the beginning of a linked chain of such entries:

TYPE(entry), POINTER :: chain

After suitable allocations and definitions, the first two entries could be addressed as

chain%value           chain%next%value
chain%index           chain%next%index
chain%next            chain%next%next

but we would normally define additional pointers to point at, for instance, the first and current entries in the list.

=== Association ===
A pointer's association status is one of

- undefined (initial state);
- associated (after allocation or a pointer assignment);
- disassociated:
  DEALLOCATE (p, q)  ! for returning storage
NULLIFY (p, q)     ! for setting to 'null'

Some care has to be taken not to leave a pointer 'dangling' by use of DEALLOCATE on its target without nullifying any other pointer referring to it.

The intrinsic function ASSOCIATED can test the association status of a defined pointer:

IF (ASSOCIATED(ptr)) THEN

or between a defined pointer and a defined target (which may, itself, be a pointer):

IF (ASSOCIATED(ptr, target)) THEN

An alternative way to initialize a pointer, also in a specification statement, is to use the NULL function:

REAL, POINTER, DIMENSION(:) :: vector => NULL() ! compile time
vector => NULL()                                ! run time

=== Pointers in expressions and assignments ===
For intrinsic types we can 'sweep' pointers over different sets of target data using the same code without any data movement. Given the matrix manipulation y = B C z, we can write the following code (although, in this case, the same result could be achieved more simply by other means):

REAL, TARGET  :: b(10,10), c(10,10), r(10), s(10), z(10)
REAL, POINTER :: a(:,:), x(:), y(:)
INTEGER mult
:
DO mult = 1, 2
   IF (mult == 1) THEN
      y => r              ! no data movement
      a => c
      x => z
   ELSE
      y => s              ! no data movement
      a => b
      x => r
   END IF
   y = MATMUL(a, x)       ! common calculation
END DO

For objects of derived type we have to distinguish between pointer and normal assignment. In

TYPE(entry), POINTER :: first, current
:
first => current

the assignment causes first to point at current, whereas

first =  current

causes current to overwrite first and is equivalent to

first%value = current%value
first%index = current%index
first%next => current%next

=== Pointer arguments ===
If an actual argument is a pointer then, if the dummy argument is also a pointer,

- it must have same rank,
- it receives its association status from the actual argument,
- it returns its final association status to the actual argument (note: the target may be undefined!),
- it may not have the INTENT attribute (it would be ambiguous),
- it requires an interface block.

If the dummy argument is not a pointer, it becomes associated with the target of the actual argument:

   REAL, POINTER :: a (:,:)
      :
   ALLOCATE (a(80, 80))
      :
   CALL sub(a)
      :
SUBROUTINE sub(c)
   REAL c(:, :)

=== Pointer functions ===
Function results may also have the POINTER attribute; this is useful if the result size depends on calculations performed in the function, as in

USE data_handler
REAL x(100)
REAL, POINTER :: y(:)
:
y => compact(x)

where the module data_handler contains

FUNCTION compact(x)
   REAL, POINTER :: compact(:)
   REAL x(:)
   ! A procedure to remove duplicates from the array x
   INTEGER n
   :              ! Find the number of distinct values, n
   ALLOCATE(compact(n))
   :              ! Copy the distinct values into compact
END FUNCTION compact

The result can be used in an expression (but must be associated with a defined target).

=== Arrays of pointers ===
These do not exist as such: given

TYPE(entry) :: rows(n)

then

rows%next              ! illegal

would be such an object, but with an irregular storage pattern. For this reason they are not allowed. However, we can achieve the same effect by defining a derived data type with a pointer as its sole component:

TYPE row
   REAL, POINTER :: r(:)
END TYPE

and then defining arrays of this data type

TYPE(row) :: s(n), t(n)

where the storage for the rows can be allocated by, for instance,

DO i = 1, n
   ALLOCATE (t(i)%r(1:i)) ! Allocate row i of length i
END DO

The array assignment s = tis then equivalent to the pointer assignments s(i)%r => t(i)%r for all components.

=== Pointers as dynamic aliases ===
Given an array

REAL, TARGET :: table(100,100)

that is frequently referenced with the fixed subscripts

table(m:n, p:q)

these references may be replaced by

REAL, DIMENSION(:, :), POINTER :: window
   :
window => table(m:n, p:q)

The subscripts of window are 1:n-m+1, 1:q-p+1. Similarly, for tar%u (as defined in already), we can use, say, taru => tar%u to point at all the u components of tar, and subscript it as taru(1, 2)

The subscripts are as those of tar itself. (This replaces yet more of EQUIVALENCE.)

In the pointer association

pointer => array_expression

the lower bounds for pointer are determined as if lbound was applied to array_expression. Thus, when a pointer is assigned to a whole array variable, it inherits the lower bounds of the variable, otherwise, the lower bounds default to 1.

Fortran 2003 allows specifying arbitrary lower bounds on pointer association, like

window(r:,s:) => table(m:n,p:q)

so that the bounds of window become r:r+n-m,s:s+q-p. Fortran 95 does not have this feature; however, it can be simulated using the following trick (based on the pointer association rules for assumed shape array dummy arguments):

FUNCTION remap_bounds2(lb1,lb2,array) RESULT(ptr)
   INTEGER, INTENT(IN)                            :: lb1,lb2
   REAL, DIMENSION(lb1:,lb2:), INTENT(IN), TARGET :: array
   REAL, DIMENSION(:,:), POINTER                  :: ptr
   ptr => array
END FUNCTION
  :
window => remap_bounds2(r,s,table(m:n,p:q))

The source code of an extended example of the use of pointers to support a data structure is in pointer.f90.

== Intrinsic procedures ==
Most of the intrinsic functions have already been mentioned. Here, we deal only with their general classification and with those that have so far been omitted. All intrinsic procedures can be used with keyword arguments:

CALL DATE_AND_TIME (TIME=t)

and many have optional arguments.

The intrinsic procedures are grouped into four categories:

1. elemental - work on scalars or arrays, e.g. ABS(a);
2. inquiry - independent of value of argument (which may be undefined), e.g. PRECISION(a);
3. transformational - array argument with array result of different shape, e.g. RESHAPE(a, b);
4. subroutines, e.g. SYSTEM_CLOCK.

The procedures not already introduced are

Bit inquiry

BIT_SIZE	Number of bits in the model

Bit manipulation

BTEST	Bit testing
IAND	Logical AND
IBCLR	Clear bit
IBITS	Bit extraction
IBSET	Set bit
IEOR	Exclusive OR
IOR	Inclusive OR
ISHFT	Logical shift
ISHFTC	Circular shift
NOT	Logical complement

Transfer function, as in

INTEGER :: i = TRANSFER('abcd', 0)

(replaces part of EQUIVALENCE)

Subroutines

DATE_AND_TIME	Obtain date and/or time
MVBITS	Copies bits
RANDOM_NUMBER	Returns pseudorandom numbers
RANDOM_SEED	Access to seed
SYSTEM_CLOCK	Access to system clock
CPU_TIME	Returns processor time in seconds

== Data transfer ==
=== Formatted input/output ===
These examples illustrate various forms of I/O lists with some simple formats (see below):

INTEGER             :: i
REAL, DIMENSION(10) :: a
CHARACTER(len=20)   :: word
PRINT "(i10)",     i
PRINT "(10f10.3)", a
PRINT "(3f10.3)",  a(1),a(2),a(3)
PRINT "(a10)",     word(5:14)
PRINT "(3f10.3)",  a(1)*a(2)+i, SQRT(a(3:4))

Variables, but not expressions, are equally valid in input statements using the READ statement:

READ "(i10)", i

If an array appears as an item, it is treated as if the elements were specified in array element order.

Any pointers in an I/O list must be associated with a target, and transfer takes place between the file and the targets.

An item of derived type is treated as if the components were specified in the same order as in the type declaration, so

read "(8f10.5)", p, t  ! types point and triangle

has the same effect as the statement

READ "(8f10.5)", p%x, p%y, t%a%x, t%a%y, t%b%x, &
                           t%b%y, t%c%x, t%c%y

An object in an I/O list is not permitted to be of a derived type that has a pointer component at any level of component selection.

Note that a zero-sized array may occur as an item in an I/O list. Such an item corresponds to no actual data transfer.

The format specification may also be given in the form of a character expression:

CHARACTER(len=*), parameter :: form = "(f10.3)"
:
PRINT form, q

or as an asterisk – this is a type of I/O known as list-directed I/O (see below), in which the format is defined by the computer system:

PRINT *, "Square-root of q = ", SQRT(q)

Input/output operations are used to transfer data between the storage of an executing program and an external medium, specified by a unit number. However, two I/O statements, PRINT and a variant of READ, do not reference any unit number: this is referred to as terminal I/O. Otherwise the form is:

READ (UNIT=4,     FMT="(f10.3)") q
READ (UNIT=nunit, FMT="(f10.3)") q
READ (UNIT=4*i+j, FMT="(f10.3)") a

where UNIT= is optional. The value may be any nonnegative integer allowed by the system for this purpose (but 0, 5 and 6 often denote the error, keyboard and terminal, respectively).

An asterisk is a variant – again from the keyboard:

READ (UNIT=*, FMT="(f10.3)") q

A read with a unit specifier allows exception handling:

READ (UNIT=NUNIT, FMT="(3f10.3)", IOSTAT=ios) a,b,c
IF (ios == 0) THEN
!     Successful read - continue execution.
   :
ELSE
!     Error condition - take appropriate action.
   CALL error (ios)
END IF

There a second type of formatted output statement, the WRITE statement:

WRITE (UNIT=nout, FMT="(10f10.3)", IOSTAT=ios) a

=== Internal files ===
These allow format conversion between various representations to be carried out by the program in a storage area defined within the program itself.

INTEGER, DIMENSION(30)         :: ival
INTEGER                        :: key
CHARACTER(LEN=30)              :: buffer
CHARACTER(LEN=6), DIMENSION(3), PARAMETER :: form = (/ "(30i1)", "(15i2)","(10i3)" /)
READ (UNIT=*, FMT="(a30,i1)")      buffer, key
READ (UNIT=buffer, FMT=form(key)) ival(1:30/key)

If an internal file is a scalar, it has a single record whose length is that of the scalar.

If it is an array, its elements, in array element order, are treated as successive records of the file and each has length that of an array element.

An example using a WRITE statement is

INTEGER           :: day
REAL              :: cash
CHARACTER(LEN=50) :: line
:
!   write into line
WRITE (UNIT=line, FMT="(a, i2, a, f8.2, a)") "Takings for day ", day, " are ", cash, " dollars"

that might write

 Takings for day  3 are  4329.15 dollars

=== List-directed I/O ===
An example of a read without a specified format for input is

INTEGER               :: i
REAL                  :: a
COMPLEX, DIMENSION(2) :: field
LOGICAL               :: flag
CHARACTER(LEN=12)     :: title
CHARACTER(LEN=4)      :: word
:
READ *, i, a, field, flag, title, word

If this reads the input record

10 6.4 (1.0,0.0) (2.0,0.0) t test/

(in which blanks are used as separators), then i, a, field, flag, and title will acquire the values 10, 6.4, (1.0,0.0) and (2.0,0.0), .true. and test respectively, while word remains unchanged.

Quotation marks or apostrophes are required as delimiters for a string that contains a blank.

=== Non-advancing I/O ===
This is a form of reading and writing without always advancing the file position to ahead of the next record. Whereas an advancing I/O statement always repositions the file after the last record accessed, a non-advancing I/O statement performs no such repositioning and may therefore leave the file positioned within a record.

CHARACTER(LEN=3)  :: key
INTEGER           :: u, s, ios
:
READ(UNIT=u, FMT="(a3)", ADVANCE="no", SIZE=s, IOSTAT=ios) key
IF (ios == 0) THEN
   :
ELSE
!    key is not in one record
   key(s+1:) = ""
   :
END IF

A non-advancing read might read the first few characters of a record and a normal read the remainder.

In order to write a prompt to a terminal screen and to read from the next character position on the screen without an intervening line-feed, we can write

WRITE (UNIT=*, FMT="(a)", ADVANCE="no") "enter next prime number:"
READ  (UNIT=*, FMT="(i10)") prime_number

Non-advancing I/O is for external files, and is not available for list-directed I/O.

=== Edit descriptors ===
It is possible to specify that an edit descriptor be repeated a specified number of times, using a repeat count: 10f12.3

The slash edit descriptor (see below) may have a repeat count, and a repeat count can also apply to a group of edit descriptors, enclosed in parentheses, with nesting:

PRINT "(2(2i5,2f8.2))", i(1),i(2),a(1),a(2), i(3),i(4),a(3),a(4)

Entire format specifications can be repeated:

PRINT "(10i8)", (/ (i(j), j=1,200) /)

writes 10 integers, each occupying 8 character positions, on each of 20 lines (repeating the format specification advances to the next line).

==== Data edit descriptors ====
- Integer: iW iW.M
- Real: fW.D esW.D esW.DeE
- Complex: pairs of f or es edit descriptors
- Logical: lW
- Character: a aW
- Derived types: are edited by the appropriate sequence of edit descriptors corresponding to the intrinsic types of the ultimate components of the derived type.
  TYPE, PUBLIC :: string
   INTEGER   :: length
   CHARACTER(LEN=20) :: word
END TYPE string
TYPE(string) :: text
READ(UNIT=*, FMT="(i2, a)") text

==== Control edit descriptors ====
Control edit descriptors setting conditions:

- The ss (sign suppress) edit descriptor suppresses leading plus signs. To switch on plus sign printing, the sp (sign print) descriptor is used. The s edit descriptor restores the option to the processor.
- This descriptor remains in force for the remainder of the format specification, unless another of them is met.

Control edit descriptors for immediate processing:

- Tabulation: tN trN tlN
  READ (UNIT=*, FMT="(t3,i4, tl4,i1, i2)") i,j,k
- New records: / N/
  READ "(i5,i3,/,i5,i3,i2)", i, j, k, l, m
  Note that
  PRINT "(i5,4/,i5)", i, j
  separates the two values by three blank records.
- Colon editing: : terminates format control if there are no further items in an I/O list.
  PRINT "( i5, :, /, i5, :, /, i5)", (/(l(i), i=1,n)/)
  stops new records if n equals 1 or 2.

=== Unformatted I/O ===
This type of I/O should be used only in cases where the records are generated by a program on one computer, to be read back on the same computer or another computer using the same internal number representations:

OPEN(UNIT=4, FILE='test', FORM='unformatted')
READ(UNIT=4) q
WRITE(UNIT=nout, IOSTAT=ios) a  ! no fmt=

=== Direct-access files ===
This form of I/O is also known as random access or indexed I/O. Here, all the records have the same length, and each record is identified by an index number. It is possible to write, read, or re-write any specified record without regard to position.

INTEGER, PARAMETER :: nunit=2, length=100
REAL, DIMENSION(length)            :: a
REAL, DIMENSION(length+1:2*length) :: b
INTEGER                            :: i, rec_length
:
INQUIRE (IOLENGTH=rec_length) a
OPEN (UNIT=nunit, ACCESS="direct", RECL=rec_length, STATUS="scratch", ACTION="readwrite")
:
!   Write array b to direct-access file in record 14
WRITE (UNIT=nunit, REC=14) b
:
!
!   Read the array back into array a
READ (UNIT=nunit, REC=14) a
:
DO i = 1, length/2
   a(i) = i
END DO
!
!   Replace modified record
WRITE (UNIT=nunit, REC=14) a

The file must be an external file and list-directed formatting and non-advancing I/O are unavailable.

== Operations on external files ==
Once again, this is an overview only.

=== File positioning statements ===
- The BACKSPACE statement:
  BACKSPACE (UNIT=u [, IOSTAT=ios])      ! where [ ] means optional
- The REWIND statement:
  REWIND (UNIT=u [, IOSTAT=ios])
- The endfile statement:
  ENDFILE (unit=u [, iostat=ios])

=== The OPEN statement ===
The statement is used to connect an external file to a unit, create a file that is preconnected, or create a file and connect it to a unit. The syntax is

OPEN (UNIT=u, STATUS=st, ACTION=act [,olist])

where olist is a list of optional specifiers. The specifiers may appear in any order.

OPEN (UNIT=2, IOSTAT=ios, FILE="cities", STATUS="new", ACCESS="direct",  &
      ACTION="readwrite", RECL=100)

Other specifiers are FORM and POSITION.

=== The CLOSE statement ===
This is used to disconnect a file from a unit.

CLOSE (UNIT=u [, IOSTAT=ios] [, STATUS=st])

as in

CLOSE (UNIT=2, IOSTAT=ios, STATUS="delete")

=== The inquire statement ===
At any time during the execution of a program it is possible to inquire about the status and attributes of a file using this statement.

Using a variant of this statement, it is similarly possible to determine the status of a unit, for instance whether the unit number exists for that system.

Another variant permits an inquiry about the length of an output list when used to write an unformatted record.

For inquire by unit

INQUIRE (UNIT=u, ilist)

or for inquire by file

INQUIRE (FILE=fln, ilist)

or for inquire by I/O list

INQUIRE (IOLENGTH=length) olist

As an example

LOGICAL            :: ex, op
CHARACTER (LEN=11) :: nam, acc, seq, frm
INTEGER            :: irec, nr
INQUIRE (UNIT=2, EXIST=ex, OPENED=op, NAME=nam, ACCESS=acc, SEQUENTIAL=seq, &
         FORM=frm, RECL=irec, NEXTREC=nr)

yields

ex      .true.
op      .true.
nam      cities
acc      DIRECT
seq      NO
frm      UNFORMATTED
irec     100
nr       1

(assuming no intervening read or write operations).

Other specifiers are IOSTAT, OPENED, NUMBER, NAMED, FORMATTED, POSITION, ACTION, READ, WRITE, READWRITE.
