= Leszynski naming convention =

The Leszynski naming convention (or LNC) is a variant of Hungarian notation popularized by consultant Stan Leszynski specifically for use with Microsoft Access development. Although the naming convention is nowadays often used within the Microsoft Access community, and is the standard in Visual Basic programming, it is not widely used elsewhere.

The conventions are derived from an earlier set of conventions, the Leszynski/Reddick naming conventions, originally developed in 1992 by Greg Reddick. Eventually, Leszynski and Reddick had different ideas about how the conventions should be developed, and split into two separate sets of conventions, the other being the RVBA Conventions.

As in all Hungarian notations, it uses prefixes (called tags) to indicate the type of objects and database development fields. The general structure of Hungarian notation (named after Charles Simonyi's native country) is to break down object names into the following elements: [prefix(es)][tag]BaseName[Suffix/Qualifier] The tags are lower case and the object name is camel case. Spaces and underscores are not used.

== Advantages ==
Since the Leszynski naming convention is a special form of Hungarian notation the same general advantages also apply to the Leszynski convention.

The use of distinctive prefixes makes your database self-documenting; when you see frmSales in VBA code, you will know that it references a form, and when you see curSales you will know that it is a Currency variable. When selecting a query from a drop-down list, you will know that a query starting with qmak is a make-table query, while one starting with quni is a union query. This information will allow you to avoid errors such as using the SetFocus method (a control method) with a field, or trying to open a table.

== Disadvantages ==
- Since the Leszynski naming convention is a special form of Hungarian notation the same general disadvantages also apply to the Leszynski convention.
- Changes in database design may require wholesale renaming. For example, replacing a table with a query would involve either retaining the tbl name for the query, or going through the entire database replacing the tbl name with a query name.
- When transferring the database to a different DBMS, problems will arise if the target DBMS does not support CamelCase names.
- As every object of the same type starts with the same letter, it is not possible to navigate through the objects in a List box by typing the beginning letter.

== Elements ==
The elements of the naming convention are described in the following table.

Component	Description	Example
Prefix(es)	A lowercase letter that adds extra information to the tag	p for Public variable
Tag	A three-letter sequence indicating the object type	tbl for table
BaseName	A word or two describing the object. If several words are used, each starts with a capital letter, and there are no spaces between them	OutlookContacts – contacts imported from Outlook
Suffix (RVBA), Qualifier (LNC)	A word giving more specific information about an object	ByDate – the data is sorted by date

=== The Basic LNC Object Prefixes ===
Object	Tag
Incomplete objects, backup objects, or objects that are under development	_ or – (In some versions of Access, dashes sort to the beginning of the database object list.)
Hidden system objects	zh
Displayed system objects	zs
Programmatically created temporary objects	zt
Backup copies of objects, for later copying or reuse	zz

=== The Basic LNC Variable Prefixes ===
Variable Type	Tag
Local variable	[no prefix]
Local static variable	s
Module-level variable	m
Public variable in a form or report module	p
Public variable declared in the Declarations section of a standard module	g

=== The Basic LNC Database Object Tags ===
Object	Tag
Class module	cls
Form	frm
Form (dialog)	fdlg
Form (menu)	fmnu
Form (message)	fmsg
Form (subform)	fsub
Macro	mcr
Module	bas
Module	mod
Query (any type)	qry
Query (append)	qapp
Query (crosstab)	qxtb
Query (data definition)	qddl
Query (delete)	qdel
Query (form filter)	qflt
Query (lookup)	qlkp
Query (make-table)	qmak
Query (select)	qry (or qsel)
Query (SQL pass-through)	qspt
Query (union)	quni
Query (update)	qupd
Report	rpt
Report (subreport)	rsub
Table	tbl
Middle Table	trel
Table (attached dBASE)	tdbf
Table (attached Excel)	txls
Table (attached FoxPro)	tfox
Table (attached Lotus)	twks
Table (attached ODBC)	todb
Table (attached Paradox)	tpdx
Table (attached SQL Server)	tsql
Table (attached text)	ttxt
Table (lookup)	tlkp
Pages	pge

=== The LNC Table Field Tags ===
Object	Tag
Autonumber (random non-sequential)	idn
Autonumber (replication ID)	idr
Autonumber (sequential)	ids
Binary	bin
Byte	byt
Currency	cur
Date/Time	dtm
Double	dbl
Hyperlink	hlk
Integer	int
Long	lng
Memo	mem
OLE	ole
Single	sng
Text (character)	chr
Yes/No (Boolean)	ysn

=== The LNC Tags for VBA Variables ===
Object	Tag
Boolean	bln
CommandBar	cbr
Control (generic; useful when cycling through controls on a form or report)	ctl
Currency	cur
Database	dbs
Double	dbl
Form	frm
Integer	int
Long	lng
QueryDef	qdf
Report	rpt
Single	sng
Snapshot	snp
String	str
Table	tbl
Type (user-defined)	typ
Variant	var

=== The LNC Tags for Form and Report Controls ===
(may also be used in code referencing controls)
Object	Tag
Attachment	att
Bound object frame	frb
Chart (graph)	cht
Check box	chk
Combo box	cbo
Command button	cmd
Custom control	ocx
Frame	fra
Hyperlink	hlk
Image	img
Label	lbl
Line	lin
List box	lst
Option button (Radio Button)	opt
Option group	grp
Page (on a Tab control)	pge
Page break	brk
Rectangle (shape)	shp
Subform/report	sub
Tab control	tab
Text box	txt
Toggle button	tgl
Button	btn
Unbound object frame	fru

=== Some Typical LNC Names for Database Objects, Controls and Variables ===
Object/variable name	LNC naming elements	Description
tblEmployees	tag + base name	A table of employee data
qupdSales	tag + base name	A query that updates sales data
fsubDayMax	tag + base name + qualifier	A subform that shows the maximum day
intLines	tag + base name	An Integer variable to hold a value representing the number of lines in a Word table
curSales	tag + base name	A Currency variable holding a Sales value
pstrForm	prefix + tag + base name	A public String variable holding a form name
zztblContacts	prefix + tag + base name	A backup Contacts table, for copying and filling with imported data
