= LNC =

LNC may refer to:

- Lancaster Regional Airport, a public-use airfield in Lancaster, Texas, United States (FAA identification code)
- Lancaster station (Pennsylvania), a train station in Lancaster, Pennsylvania, United States (Amtrak station code)
- Late Night Counsell, an Ottawa late night talk radio show
- Law of Non-Contradiction, one of Aristotle's three classic laws of thought
- Legal nurse consultant, a health care professional that aids in legal cases
- Leszynski naming convention, a guide for programming notation
- Lëvizja Nacionale Çlirimtare or National Liberation Movement, an Albanian resistance organization during World War II
- Coalition (Australia), political alliance of the Liberal and National parties in Australia
- Libertarian National Committee
- Libertarian National Convention
- Local News on Cable Virginia
- London Necropolis Company
- Low noise converter, a device used in satellite receivers
