= Naming convention =

Generally agreed scheme for naming things

A naming convention is a convention (generally agreed scheme) for naming things. Conventions differ in their intents, which may include to:

- Allow useful information to be deduced from the names based on regularities. For instance, in Manhattan, streets are consecutively numbered; with east–west streets called "Streets" and north–south streets called "Avenues".
- Show relationships, and in most personal naming conventions.
- Ensure that each name is unique for same scope.

== Use cases ==
Well-chosen naming conventions aid the casual user in navigating and searching larger structures. Several areas where naming conventions are commonly used include:

- In astronomy, astronomical naming conventions
- In classics, Roman naming conventions
- In computer programming, identifier naming conventions
- In computer networking, naming scheme
- In humans, naming offspring
- In industry, product naming conventions
- In the sciences, systematic names for a variety of things

== Examples ==
Examples of naming conventions may include:

- Children's names may be alphabetical by birth order. In some Asian cultures, siblings commonly share part of their given names. In many cultures the first son is usually named after the father or grandfather. In other cultures, the name may include the place of residence. Roman naming convention denotes social rank.
- Developers of database schemas, program-name terminology and ontologies may apply a common set of labeling conventions for naming representational entities in their representational artefacts, i.e. conventions outlined or endorsed by terminology-regulatory bodies or by policy providers such as ISO or the OBO Foundry.
- The names of universities can commemorate founders, patrons or relevant monarchs: note for example Lomonosov Moscow State University, Ludwig-Maximilians-Universität München, Victoria University of Wellington, or Johns Hopkins University. A Latinate version confers extra class – note Alma Mater Rudolphina for the University of Vienna or Universitas Complutensis for the Complutense University of Madrid.
- Large corporate, university, or government campuses may name rooms within their buildings to help orient tenants and visitors.
- Products. Automobiles typically have a binomial name, a "make" (manufacturer) and a "model", in addition to a model year. Computers, and computer programs, often have increasing numbers in their names to signify the successive generations.
- School courses: an abbreviation for the subject area and then a number ordered by increasing level of difficulty.
- Shipping lines often use a distinct naming convention to make their ships more recognisable and their names easier to remember.
- Virtually all organizations that assign names or numbers follow some convention in generating these identifiers (e.g. phone numbers, bank accounts, government IDs, credit cards, computer names, etc.).
