= Varchar =

Set of character data in a database

A VARCHAR or variable character field is a set of character data of indeterminate length. The term varchar refers to a data type of a field (or column) in a database which can hold letters and numbers. Varchar fields can be of any size up to a limit, which varies by databases: an Oracle 11g database has a limit of 4000 bytes, a MySQL 5.7 database has a limit of 65,535 bytes (for the entire row) and Microsoft SQL Server 2008 has a limit of 8000 bytes (unless varchar(max) is used, which has a maximum storage capacity of 2 gigabytes).

nvarchar is a variation of varchar, and which is more suitable depends on the use case.

== See also ==
- SQL data types
