= Semantic analysis (compilers) =

Computer compiler construction process

Semantic analysis or context sensitive analysis is a process in compiler construction, usually after parsing, to gather necessary semantic information from the source code. It usually includes type checking, or makes sure a variable is declared before use which is impossible to describe in the extended Backus–Naur form and thus not easily detected during parsing.

== See also ==
- Attribute grammar
- Context-sensitive language
- Semantic analysis (computer science)
