= Lemon (parser generator) =

Parser generator

- Developer: D. Richard Hipp
- Written in: C
- Operating system: Cross-platform
- Type: Parser generator
- License: Public domain
- Website: www.hwaci.com/sw/lemon/

Lemon is a parser generator, maintained as part of the SQLite project, that generates a look-ahead LR parser (LALR parser) in the programming language C from an input context-free grammar. The generator is quite simple, implemented in one C source file with another file used as a template for output. Lexical analysis is performed externally.

Lemon is similar to the programs Bison and Yacc, but is incompatible with both. The grammar input format is different, to help prevent common coding errors. Other distinctive features include a reentrant, thread-safe output parser, and the concept of non-terminal destructors that try to make it easier to avoid memory leaks.

SQLite uses Lemon with a hand-coded tokenizer to parse SQL strings.

Lemon, together with re2c and a re2c wrapper named Perplex, are used in BRL-CAD as platform-agnostic and easily compilable alternatives to Flex and Bison. This combination is also used with STEPcode.

OpenFOAM expression evaluation uses a combination of ragel and a version of lemon that has been minimally modified to ease C++ integration without affecting C integration. The parser grammars are augmented with m4 macros.
