= List of Tennessee Tech Golden Eagles in the NFL draft =

This is a list of Tennessee Tech Golden Eagles football players in the NFL draft.

== Key ==
B	Back	K	Kicker	NT	Nose tackle
C	Center	LB	Linebacker	FB	Fullback
DB	Defensive back	P	Punter	HB	Halfback
DE	Defensive end	QB	Quarterback	WR	Wide receiver
DT	Defensive tackle	RB	Running back	G	Guard
E	End	T	Offensive tackle	TE	Tight end

= Pro Bowler
= Hall of Famer

== Selections ==
Year	Round	Pick	Overall	Player	Team	Position
1954	24	10	287	Jerry Daniels	San Francisco 49ers	T
1956	14	6	163	Ted Schwanger	Baltimore Colts	B
1957	12	4	137	Don Simonic	Baltimore Colts	T
1959	17	10	202	Homer Schmittan	Baltimore Colts	E
1961	13	6	174	Tommy Hackler	San Francisco 49ers	E
1961	20	6	272	Gordon Mason	Chicago Bears	B
1968	17	10	445	Bill Hull	Minnesota Vikings	G
1970	10	9	243	Larry Schreiber	San Francisco 49ers	RB
1971	9	13	221	John Tanner	San Diego Chargers	TE
1972	5	12	116	Jim Bishop	San Diego Chargers	TE
1973	2	16	42	Jim Youngblood	Los Angeles Rams	LB
1973	4	3	81	Mike Hennigan	Detroit Lions	LB
1975	3	11	63	Elois Grooms	New Orleans Saints	DE
1976	15	13	416	Howard Stidham	San Francisco 49ers	LB
1983	12	7	314	Billy Blaylock	San Diego Chargers	DB
2005	5	27	163	Frank Omiyale	Atlanta Falcons	OT

== Notable undrafted players ==
Note: No drafts held before 1936

Debut year	Player name	Position	Debut NFL/AFL team	Notes
1964	Lonnie Warwick^{†}	LB	Minnesota Vikings	NFL Champion (1969)
1999	Corey Chamblin	CB	Baltimore Ravens	—
2000	Josh Symonette	S/LB	Washington Redskins	—
2003	D. J. Bleisath	OL/DL	Oakland Raiders	—
2008	Larry Shipp	WR	Detroit Lions	—
2012	Tim Benford	WR	Dallas Cowboys	—
2013	Da'Rick Rogers	WR	Buffalo Bills	—
2018	Dontez Byrd	WR	Atlanta Falcons	—
