= Re2c =

re2c
- Original author: Peter Bumbulis
- Release: around 1994; 32 years ago
- Stable release: 4.6 / 29 August 2026
- Type: Lexical analyzer generator
- License: Public domain
- Website: re2c.org
- Repository: github.com/skvadrik/re2c

re2c is a free and open-source lexer generator for C, C++, D, Go, Haskell, Java, JavaScript, OCaml, Python, Rust, V and Zig. It compiles declarative regular expression specifications to deterministic finite automata. Originally written by Peter Bumbulis and described in his paper, re2c was put in public domain and has been since maintained by volunteers. It is the lexer generator adopted by projects such as PHP, SpamAssassin, Ninja build system and others. Together with the Lemon parser generator, re2c is used in BRL-CAD. This combination is also used with STEPcode, an implementation of ISO 10303 standard.

== Philosophy ==
The main goal of re2c is generating fast lexers: at least as fast as reasonably optimized C lexers coded by hand. Instead of using traditional table-driven approach, re2c encodes the generated finite-state machine directly in the form of conditional jumps and comparisons. The resulting program is faster than its table-driven counterpart and much easier to debug and understand. Moreover, this approach often results in smaller lexers, as re2c applies a number of optimizations such as DFA minimization and the construction of tunnel automaton. Another distinctive feature of re2c is its flexible interface: instead of assuming a fixed program template, re2c lets the programmer write most of the interface code and adapt the generated lexer to any particular environment. The main idea is that re2c should be a zero-cost abstraction for the programmer: using it should never result in a slower program than the corresponding hand-coded implementation.

== Features ==
- Submatch extraction: re2c supports both POSIX-compliant capturing groups and standalone tags (with leftmost greedy disambiguation and optional handling of repeated submatch). The implementation is based on the lookahead-TDFA algorithm.
- Encoding support: re2c supports ASCII, UTF-8, UTF-16, UTF-32, UCS-2 and EBCDIC.
- Flexible user interface: the generated code uses a few primitive operations in order to interface with the environment (read input characters, advance to the next input position, etc.); users can redefine these primitives to whatever they need.
- Storable state: re2c supports both pull-model lexers (when lexer runs without interrupts and pulls more input as necessary) and push-model lexers (when lexer is periodically stopped and resumed to parse new chunks of input).
- Start conditions: re2c can generate multiple interrelated lexers, where each lexer is triggered by a certain condition in program.
- Self-validation: re2c has a special mode in which it ignores all used-defined interface code and generates a self-contained skeleton program. Additionally, re2c generates two files: one with the input strings derived from the regular grammar, and one with compressed match results that are used to verify lexer behavior on all inputs. Input strings are generated so that they extensively cover DFA transitions and paths. Data generation happens right after DFA construction and prior to any optimizations, but the lexer itself is fully optimized, so skeleton programs are capable of revealing any errors in optimizations and code generation.
- Warnings: re2c performs static analysis of the program and warns its users about possible deficiencies or bugs, such as undefined control flow, unreachable code, ill-formed escape symbols and potential misuse of the interface primitives.
- Debugging. Besides generating human-readable lexers, re2c has a number of options that dump various intermediate representations of the generated lexer, such as NFA, multiple stages of DFA and the resulting program graph in DOT format.

== Syntax ==
re2c program can contain any number of /*!re2c ... */ blocks. Each block consists of a sequence of rules, definitions and configurations (they can be intermixed, but it is generally better to put configurations first, then definitions and then rules). Rules have the form REGEXP { CODE } or REGEXP := CODE; where REGEXP is a regular expression and CODE is a block of C code. When REGEXP matches the input string, control flow is transferred to the associated CODE. There is one special rule: the default rule with * instead of REGEXP; it is triggered if no other rules matches. re2c has greedy matching semantics: if multiple rules match, the rule that matches longer prefix is preferred; if the conflicting rules match the same prefix, the earlier rule has priority. Definitions have the form NAME = REGEXP; (and also NAME { REGEXP } in Flex compatibility mode). Configurations have the form re2c:CONFIG = VALUE; where CONFIG is the name of the particular configuration and VALUE is a number or a string. For more advanced usage see the official re2c manual.

== Regular expressions ==
re2c uses the following syntax for regular expressions:

- "foo" case-sensitive string literal
- 'foo' case-insensitive string literal
- [a-xyz], [^a-xyz] character class (possibly negated)
- . any character except newline
- R \ S difference of character classes
- R* zero or more occurrences of R
- R+ one or more occurrences of R
- R? zero or one occurrence of R
- R{n} repetition of R exactly n times
- R{n,} repetition of R at least n times
- R{n,m} repetition of R from n to m times
- (R) just R; parentheses are used to override precedence or for POSIX-style submatch
- R S concatenation: R followed by S
- R | S alternative: R or S
- R / S lookahead: R followed by S, but S is not consumed
- name the regular expression defined as name (except in Flex compatibility mode)
- @stag an s-tag: saves the last input position at which @stag matches in a variable named stag
- #mtag an m-tag: saves all input positions at which #mtag matches in a variable named mtag

Character classes and string literals may contain the following escape sequences: \a, \b, \f, \n, \r, \t, \v, \\, octal escapes \ooo and hexadecimal escapes \xhh, \uhhhh and \Uhhhhhhhh.

== Example ==
Here is a very simple program in re2c (example.re). It checks that all input arguments are hexadecimal numbers. The code for re2c is enclosed in comments /*!re2c ... */, all the rest is plain C code. See the official re2c website for more complex examples.

#include <stdio.h>

static int lex(const char YYCURSOR[]) {
    const char* YYMARKER;
    /*!re2c
        re2c:define:YYCTYPE = char;
        re2c:yyfill:enable = 0;

        end = "\x00";
        hex = "0x" [0-9a-fA-F]+;

        *       { printf("err\n"); return 1; }
        hex end { printf("hex\n"); return 0; }
    */
}

int main(int argc, char* argv[]) {
    for (int i = 1; i < argc; ++i) {
        lex(argv[i]);
    }
    return 0;
}

Given that, re2c -is -o example.c example.re generates the code below (example.c). The contents of the comment /*!re2c ... */ are substituted with a deterministic finite automaton encoded in the form of conditional jumps and comparisons; the rest of the program is copied verbatim into the output file. There are several code generation options; normally re2c uses switch statements, but it can use nested if statements (as in this example with -s option), or generate bitmaps and jump tables. Which option is better depends on the C compiler; re2c users are encouraged to experiment.

/* Generated by re2c 1.2.1 on Fri Aug 23 21:59:00 2019 */
#include <stdio.h>

static int lex(const char *YYCURSOR)
{
    const char *YYMARKER;
    
{
	char yych;
	yych = *YYCURSOR;
	if (yych == '0') goto yy4;
	++YYCURSOR;
yy3:
	{ printf("err\n"); return 1; }
yy4:
	yych = *(YYMARKER = ++YYCURSOR);
	if (yych != 'x') goto yy3;
	yych = *++YYCURSOR;
	if (yych >= 0x01) goto yy8;
yy6:
	YYCURSOR = YYMARKER;
	goto yy3;
yy7:
	yych = *++YYCURSOR;
yy8:
	if (yych <= '@') {
		if (yych <= 0x00) goto yy9;
		if (yych <= '/') goto yy6;
		if (yych <= '9') goto yy7;
		goto yy6;
	} else {
		if (yych <= 'F') goto yy7;
		if (yych <= '`') goto yy6;
		if (yych <= 'f') goto yy7;
		goto yy6;
	}
yy9:
	++YYCURSOR;
	{ printf("hex\n"); return 0; }
}

}

int main(int argc, char **argv)
{
    for (int i = 1; i < argc; ++i) {
        lex(argv[i]);
    }
    return 0;
}

== See also ==
- Ragel
- Lex
- Comparison of parser generators
