= Ian Beer =

Ian Beer may refer to:

- Ian Beer (rugby union) (born 1931), English international rugby union player
- Ian Beer (hacker), British computer security expert and white hat hacker
