= Georgia Dome =

Former stadium in Atlanta, Georgia, U.S.

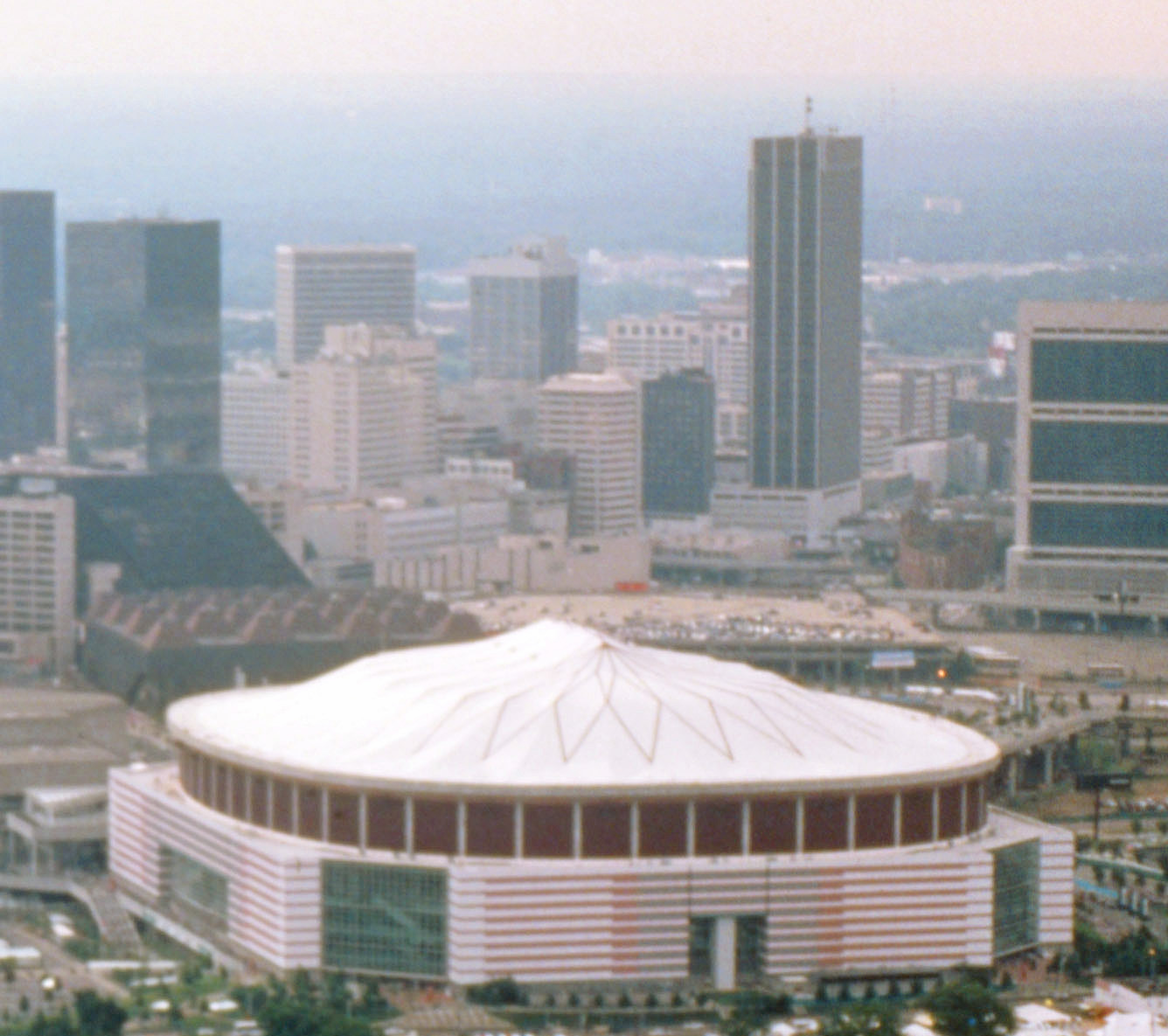
- The Georgia Dome during the 1996 Summer Olympics
- Interactive map of Georgia Dome
- Address: 1 Georgia Dome Drive Northwest; Atlanta, Georgia; United States
- Coordinates: 33.758°N 84.401°W
- Owner: Georgia World Congress Center Authority
- Operator: Georgia World Congress Center Authority
- Capacity: Football: 71,228; Georgia State football: 28,155; Basketball: 71,000; Total Capacity: 80,000
- Surface: FieldTurf (2003–2017); AstroTurf (1992–2002)
- Public transit: Dome / GWCC / Philips Arena / CNN Center (MARTA station); Vine City (MARTA station)

Construction
- Groundbreaking: November 22, 1989
- Opened: September 6, 1992; 34 years ago
- Closed: June 9, 2017
- Demolished: November 20, 2017
- Cost: $214 million ($491 million in 2025 dollars)
- Architects: Heery International; Rosser FABRAP International; and tvsdesign
- Project manager: Barton-Malow
- Structural engineer: Weidlinger Associates
- General contractor: Beers/Georgia Dome Team

Tenants
- College football Peach Bowl (NCAA) (1993–2016); Georgia State Panthers (NCAA) (2010–2016); Celebration Bowl (NCAA) (2015–2016) Professional football Atlanta Falcons (NFL) (1992–2016) Basketball Atlanta Hawks (NBA) (1997–1999)

The Georgia Dome was a domed stadium in the Southeastern United States. Located in Atlanta between downtown to the east and Vine City to the west, it was owned and operated by the State of Georgia as part of the Georgia World Congress Center Authority. Opened in 1992, it was then the second-largest covered stadium in the world by capacity, behind the Pontiac Silverdome. Though the Georgia Dome was a profitable facility, its primary tenant, the Atlanta Falcons of the National Football League, grew dissatisfied with it less than two decades after its opening and began planning for a replacement stadium. It was closed and demolished in November 2017.

In addition to the Falcons, the Georgia Dome was also the home of the Georgia State University Panthers football team. It hosted two Super Bowls (XXVIII and XXXIV), 25 editions of the Peach Bowl (January 1993 – December 2016) and 23 SEC Championship Games (1994–2016). In addition, the Georgia Dome also hosted several soccer matches since 2009 with attendances over 50,000. In its 25 years of operation, the Georgia Dome hosted over 1,400 events attended by over 37 million people. The Georgia Dome was the only stadium in the United States to host the Summer Olympics, Super Bowl and NCAA men's basketball Final Four. The Georgia Dome also hosted WrestleMania XXVII with The Rock as the host, and it was the biggest event in the venue. John Cena vs The Miz was the main event for the WWE Championship.

The Georgia Dome's successor, Mercedes-Benz Stadium, was built adjacent to the south and opened on August 26, 2017. The Georgia Dome was demolished on November 20, 2017.

== History ==
=== Facility information ===
The Georgia Dome was completed in 1992 in time for the 1996 Summer Olympics at a cost of $214 million, making it one of the largest state-funded construction projects in Georgia history. The stadium seated 71,228 for football, approximately 80,000 for concerts, and 71,000 for basketball when the stadium fully opened and 40,000 for basketball and gymnastics when the stadium was sectioned off (one half closed off by a large curtain). For most Georgia State football games, the dome was configured with 28,155 seats, with tickets for only the bulk of the lower level and the club-level seats on sale. The record for overall attendance at the Georgia Dome came during a college football game, with 80,892 at the SEC Championship Game in 2008.

The Dome had 5,740 club seats and 171 luxury boxes. The executives suites fit 16-24 people, while eight super-suites added in 2007 were capable of accommodating 57-96 guests. There were also four restaurants/bars. There were 12 escalators and 9 elevators.

The structure was located on 9.19 acres (3.72 hectares) of land; the Dome had a height of 271 ft (83 m), a structure length of 746 ft (227 m), a structure width of 607 ft (185 m), and a total floor area of 102,150 square feet (9,490 m^{2}). The stadium was the largest cable-supported dome in the world. Its roof was made of teflon-coated fiberglass fabric and had an area of 374,584 square feet (34,800 m^{2}). From its completion until the December 31, 1999, opening of the 20-acre (8.09-hectare) Millennium Dome in London, it was the largest hooked domed structure of any type in the world. Matt Hartley Lighting, LLC designed the lighting for the concourse of the Georgia Dome.

=== Surface ===
The Georgia Dome originally used AstroTurf artificial surface for its football events. In 2003, Arthur Blank, the new owner of Atlanta Falcons, funded the installation of the new infilled FieldTurf artificial surface system.

=== Renovations ===
In 2006, the Atlanta Falcons and the Georgia World Congress Center Authority announced a $300 million renovation to the Georgia Dome. The project was separated into two stages. The first stage, which took place before the 2007 NFL season, focused on updating the premium seating areas, including the creation of eight 'super-suites' as well as an owners' club, most of them now incorporating new plasma televisions. In 2008, the exterior of the stadium was repainted, replacing the original teal and maroon color scheme with a red, black, and silver theme to match the Falcons' team colors; the stadium's original teal seats were replaced with red seats in the lower and upper levels and black seats in the middle level. The entrance gates and concourses were also renovated and updated before the 2008 football season. In 2009, the video screens in both end zones were relocated to a new exterior monument sign on Northside Drive. The interior end zones each received a new and considerably wider HD video screen that significantly enhanced views of replays, as well as graphics and digital presentations. A new sound system was installed in the same year, replacing the previous system that was nearly 20 years old.

In 2008, the Georgia Dome started showing safety videos before games, presented by Deltalina, flight attendant "mascot" of Delta Air Lines. The videos satirize Delta's massively popular "Deltalina" inflight safety videos. The videos' theme was "Delta Safety First".

=== Major weather-related issues ===
Three years after the completion of the Dome, the integrity of its roof became an issue. During a Falcons pre-season game on August 11, 1995, a severe thunderstorm caused water to pool on the fabric, tearing part of the material, and causing a section of the roof to fall into the stadium. The storm was intense enough that the roof panels could be seen moving during the game, and the roof material fell with enough force to smash seats and knock holes in concrete floors. The collapse occurred after fans left the stadium, and no one was injured during the incident. The roof was eventually repaired in a way that prevented similar incidents from occurring in the future.

In the 2008 Atlanta tornado outbreak on March 14, 2008, during the 2008 SEC men's basketball tournament, an EF2 tornado ripped holes in the dome and damaged panels along the side of the structure during the Alabama–Mississippi State quarterfinal game, delaying the game for over an hour. The quarterfinal game to follow between the Kentucky Wildcats and Georgia Bulldogs was postponed until the following day. The resulting damage forced the rest of the tournament to be moved to the Alexander Memorial Coliseum, now known as McCamish Pavilion, at Georgia Tech.

=== Final years and replacement ===
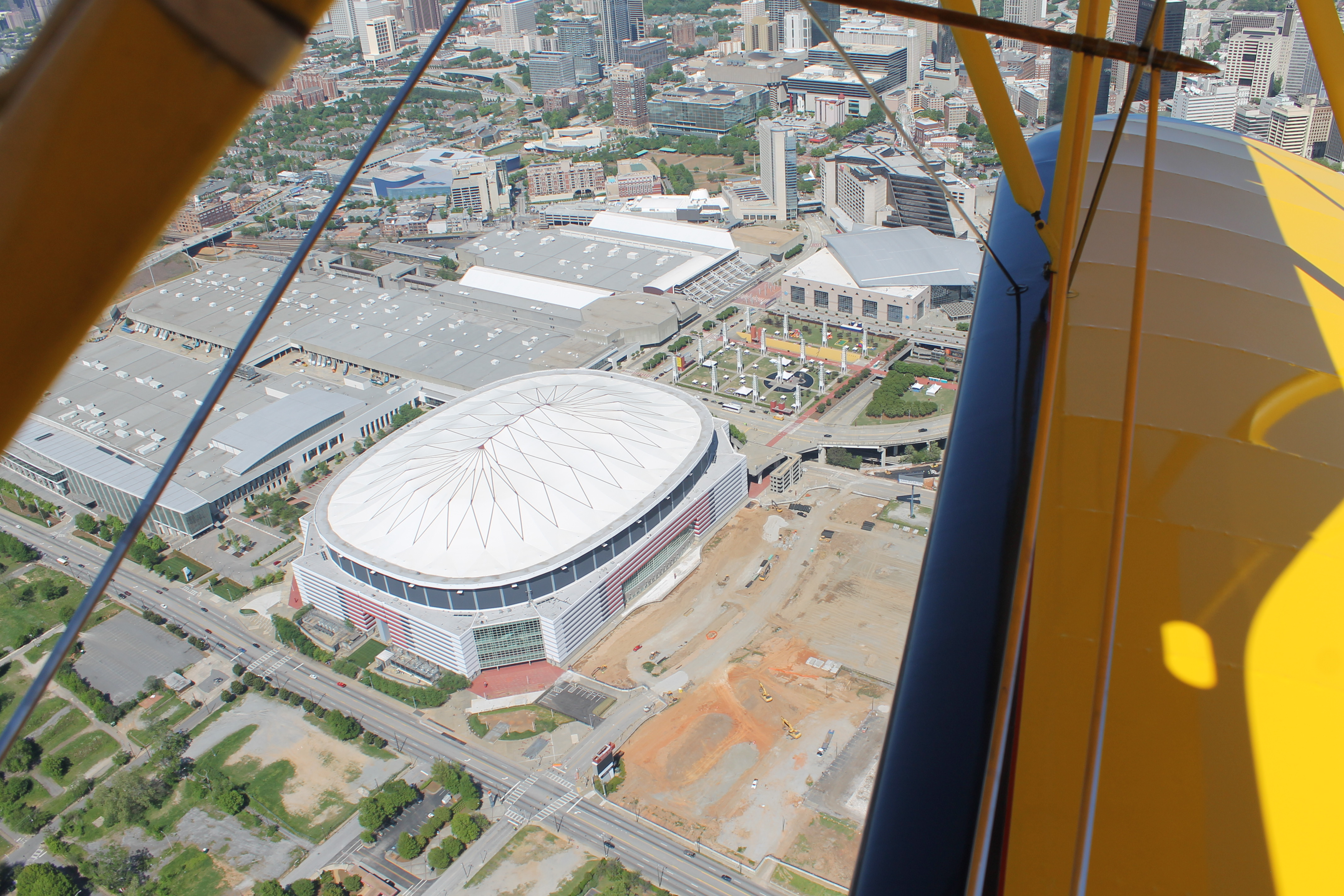
Aerial photo of the Georgia Dome in 2014; the land next to it was cleared for the then-ongoing construction of Mercedes-Benz Stadium.

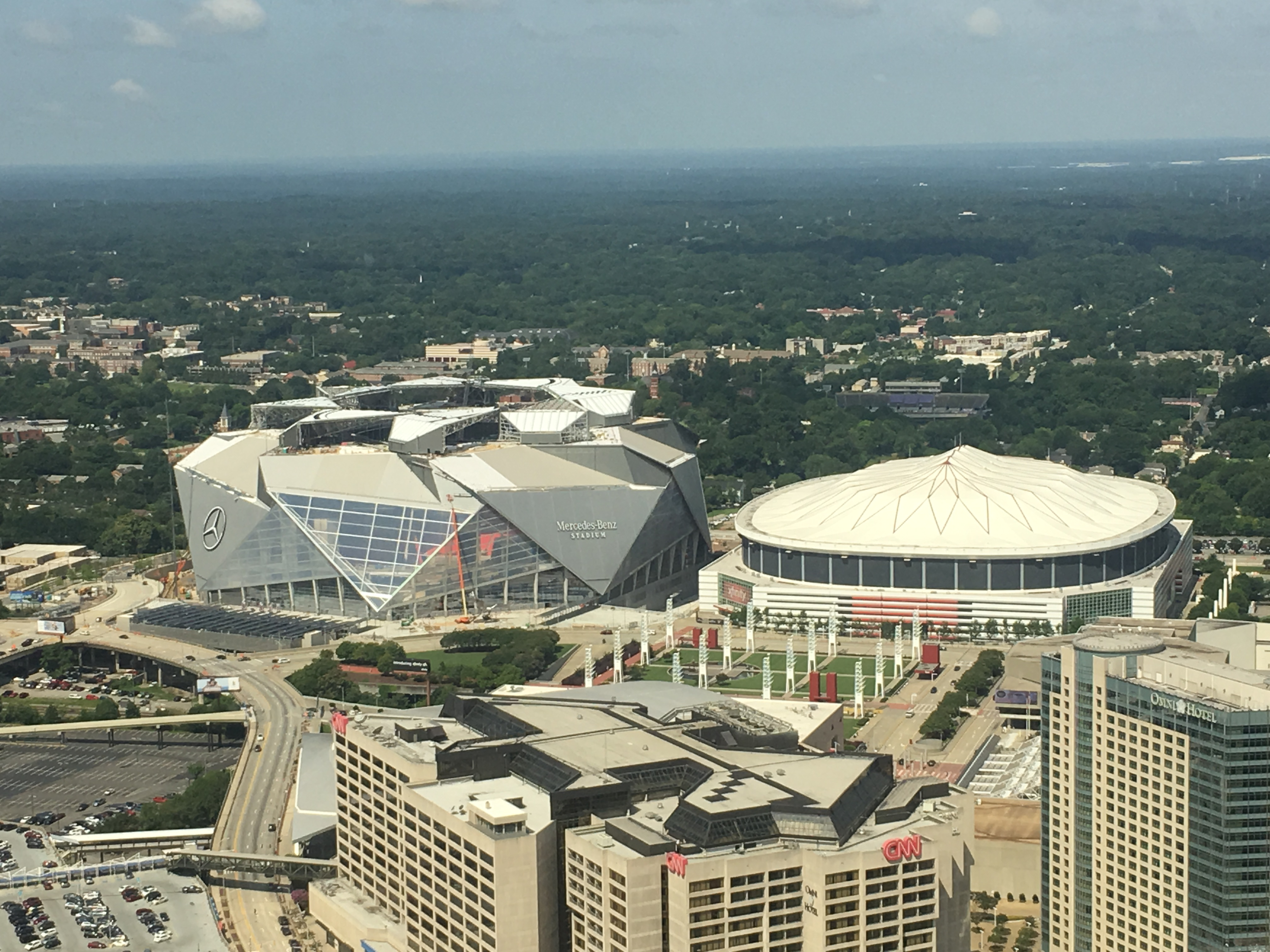
The Georgia Dome (right) and Mercedes-Benz Stadium on July 2, 2017

In 2010, the Georgia World Congress Center Authority announced plans for a new stadium just south of the Georgia Dome. At the time, the Georgia Dome had just completed a major update and was still relatively young. The Dome had been designed specifically for football while a handful of NFL teams still made do with multi-purpose stadiums shared with MLB teams; plus, the Dome had plenty of luxury suites and premium seating which were important revenue-generating features lacking other older venues which made them obsolete. Nonetheless, sports economist Rod Fort noted that pro sports team owners "thought they could get away with demanding new" stadiums every year with public money; plus, the Falcons did not have control of the Dome nor the profits, which made them less competitive than other teams that owned state-of-the-art facilities. In addition, Arthur Blank "wanted a state-of-the-art facility for his NFL and MLS teams and was willing to pitch in a huge amount of money to make it happen", as well as wanting to host another Super Bowl. Also with the Atlanta climate the Falcons long desired to play outdoors in either an open-air stadium or retractable roof stadium rather than inside a dome. At the time it was planned to retain the Georgia Dome to continue hosting non-NFL events.

In justifying the need for a new venue, Falcons CEO and president Rich McKay said that the Georgia Dome "was a really functional building that served its purpose very well. We did not want to build a better Georgia Dome. That was not the object. If we would have done that, we would have renovated the Georgia Dome. We really wanted to change the game and do it for a long, long time." Stadium general manager Scott Jenkins described the new stadium's advantages over the Dome, saying "The LED displays we have, whether it's every seat is two-inches wider than the Georgia Dome, almost all the concourses connect so you can circumnavigate the building, you don't get cut-off. You can move vertically throughout the building, we have really wide staircases, we have twice the elevators, twice the escalators compared to the Georgia Dome". McKay said of it, "The architecture, I think, speaks for itself. I hope the first time you're in it, yeah, you're wowed by the architecture, but more wowed by the fan experience." SB Nation noted that while the "Georgia Dome did its job for 24 years...it wasn't anything special. That's not the case with [the Mercedes-Benz Stadium]. Walking up to it feels like you're approaching a darn spaceship".

The new stadium, which would be known as Mercedes-Benz Stadium, received approval from the city of Atlanta, Fulton County, and Georgia state governments in 2013. Construction commenced and ground was broken in 2014.

The Falcons' final game in the Dome was the 2016 NFC Championship Game on January 22, 2017, with a 44–21 victory over the Green Bay Packers, that sent the Falcons to their second Super Bowl appearance in franchise history. The stadium's final public event took place on March 4 and 5, 2017, with back-to-back Monster Jam shows.

=== Demolition ===
Shortly after the Georgia Dome's closing, a group presented a petition to the governor's office to save the stadium from demolition, arguing that it was still in good condition and that its loss would be wasteful. While the Falcons initially sought an open-air stadium to complement the Georgia Dome, GWCCA officials ultimately concluded that maintaining two 70,000-seat stadiums was not financially feasible, and the Georgia Dome's fate was already sealed when Mercedes-Benz Stadium was approved in 2013.

Demolition of the Georgia Dome was intended to begin shortly after the stadium's final event; however, due to construction delays caused by the complexity of Mercedes-Benz Stadium's eight-panel retractable roof, demolition of the Georgia Dome was postponed until the new stadium's certificate of occupancy could be issued. GWCCA officials stated that the Georgia Dome would remain nominally operational until Mercedes-Benz Stadium was ready; however, the Dome's artificial turf had been removed and its offices vacated prior to the announcement of the new stadium's delay.

On June 9, 2017, Steve Cannon, CEO of the Falcons' parent company AMB Group, stated that construction officials were confident that Mercedes-Benz Stadium would be ready in time for the Falcons' first preseason game, and the process of decommissioning the Georgia Dome had resumed, with the Dome scheduled for implosion on November 20, 2017, at 7:30 am EST.

In July 2017, GWCCA officials removed equipment they intend to reuse either at Mercedes-Benz Stadium or elsewhere on the GWCC campus while other equipment was liquidated by sealed bids. Most of the seats in the lower and middle bowls were sold in bulk to high schools and colleges while pairs were sold to individuals; most of the upper bowl seats were recycled. The stadium's lower bowl and loading docks were demolished by mid-August. From September 16 to 30, 2017, memorabilia from the Georgia Dome was sold in an online auction format by Schneider Industries.

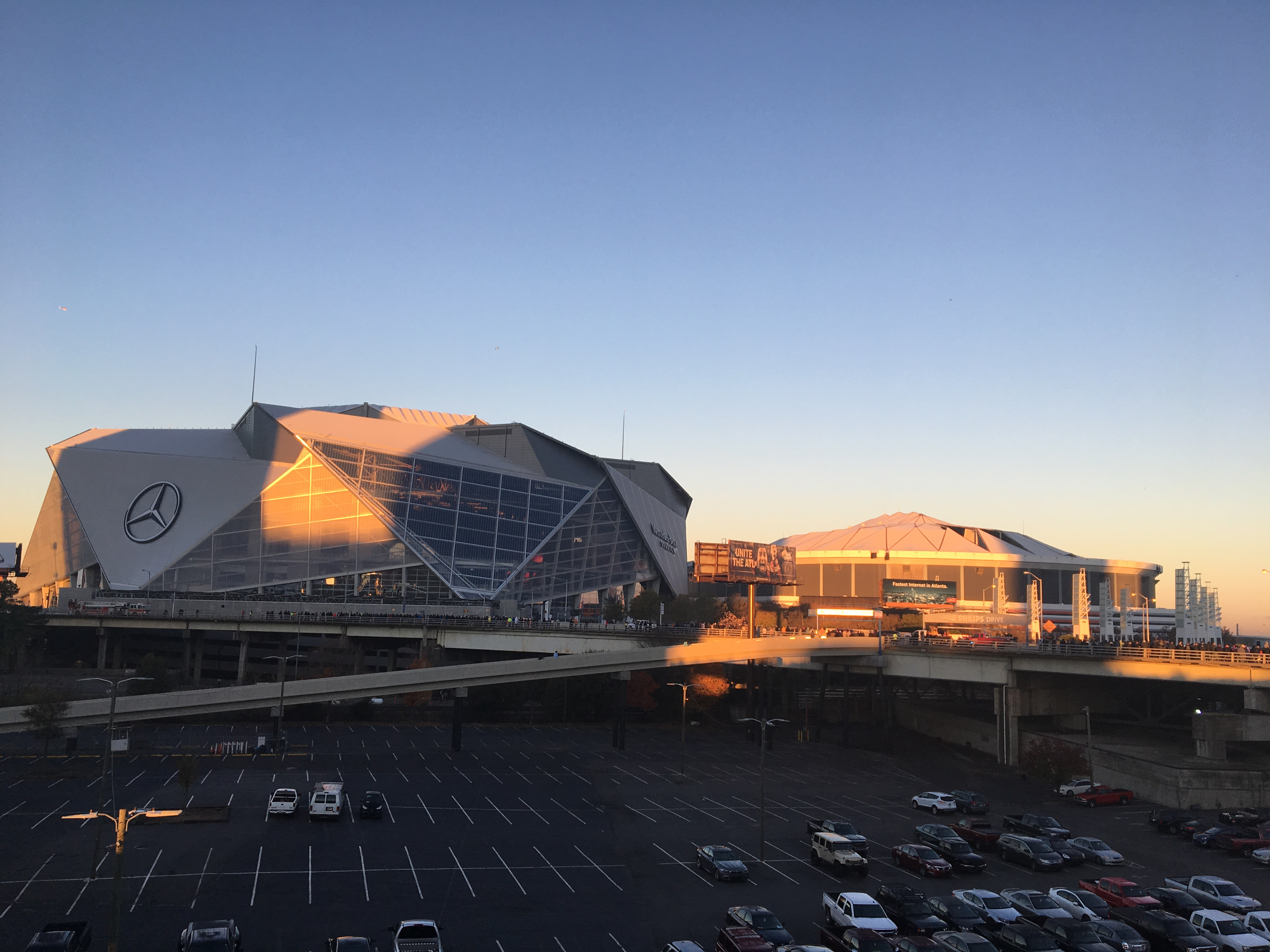
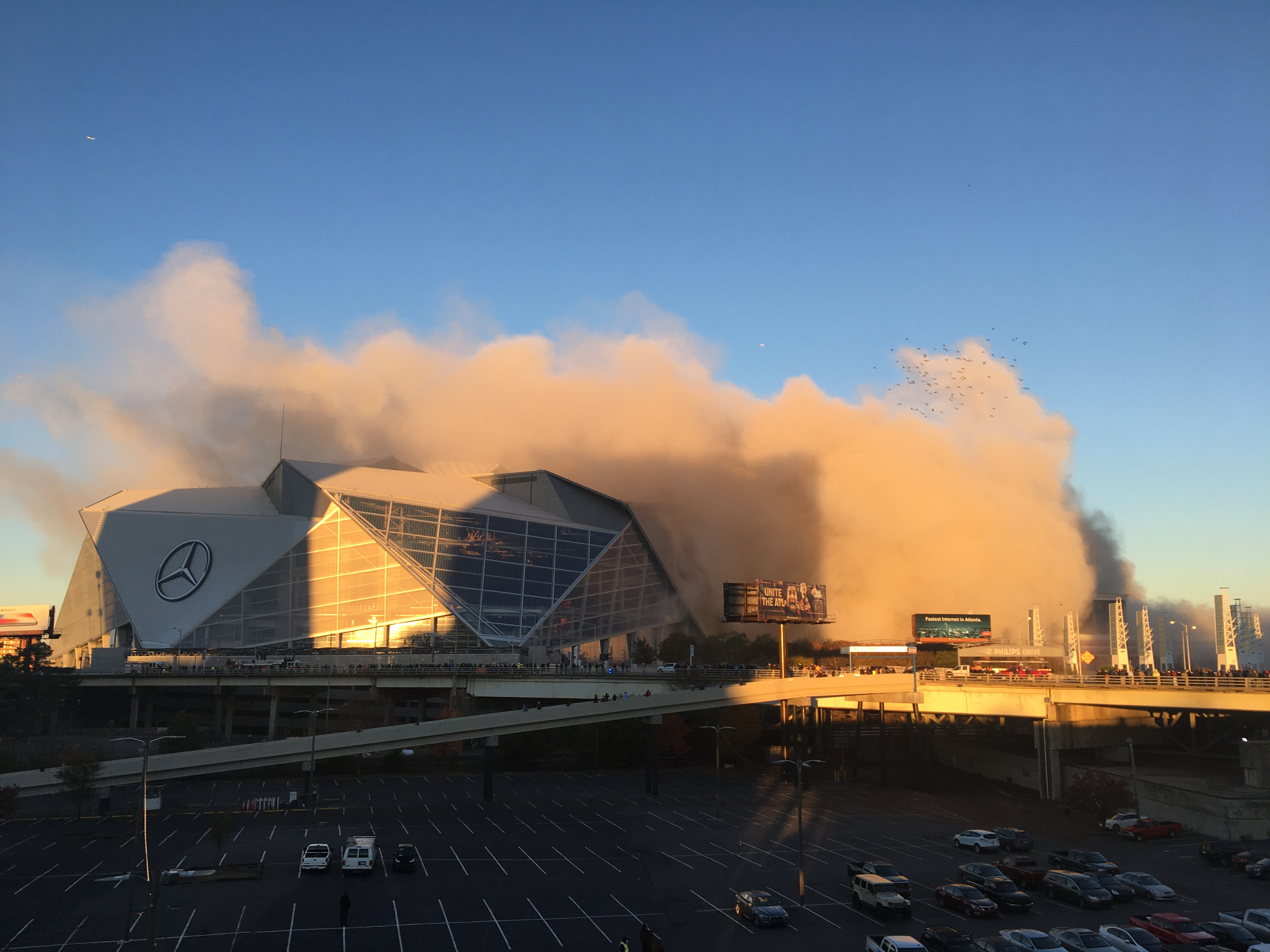
The Dome before and after the implosion

Demolition officials from Adamo Demolition, the company contracted for the job, stated that the pressure from the implosion needed to go up from the roof and not out through the sides to ensure that Mercedes-Benz Stadium and other nearby buildings were not damaged during the demolition; to protect nearby structures, construction felt was placed over the four corners of the Dome, and a 70 foot (21 m) tall fence covered in the same material was erected between the Dome and Mercedes-Benz Stadium. To ensure that the roof fell in place during the implosion, parts of the concrete ring supporting the roof had been chipped away and ventilation holes were cut into the roof fabric. 4,800 pounds (2,200 kg) of explosives were used to bring the Dome down within 12 seconds.

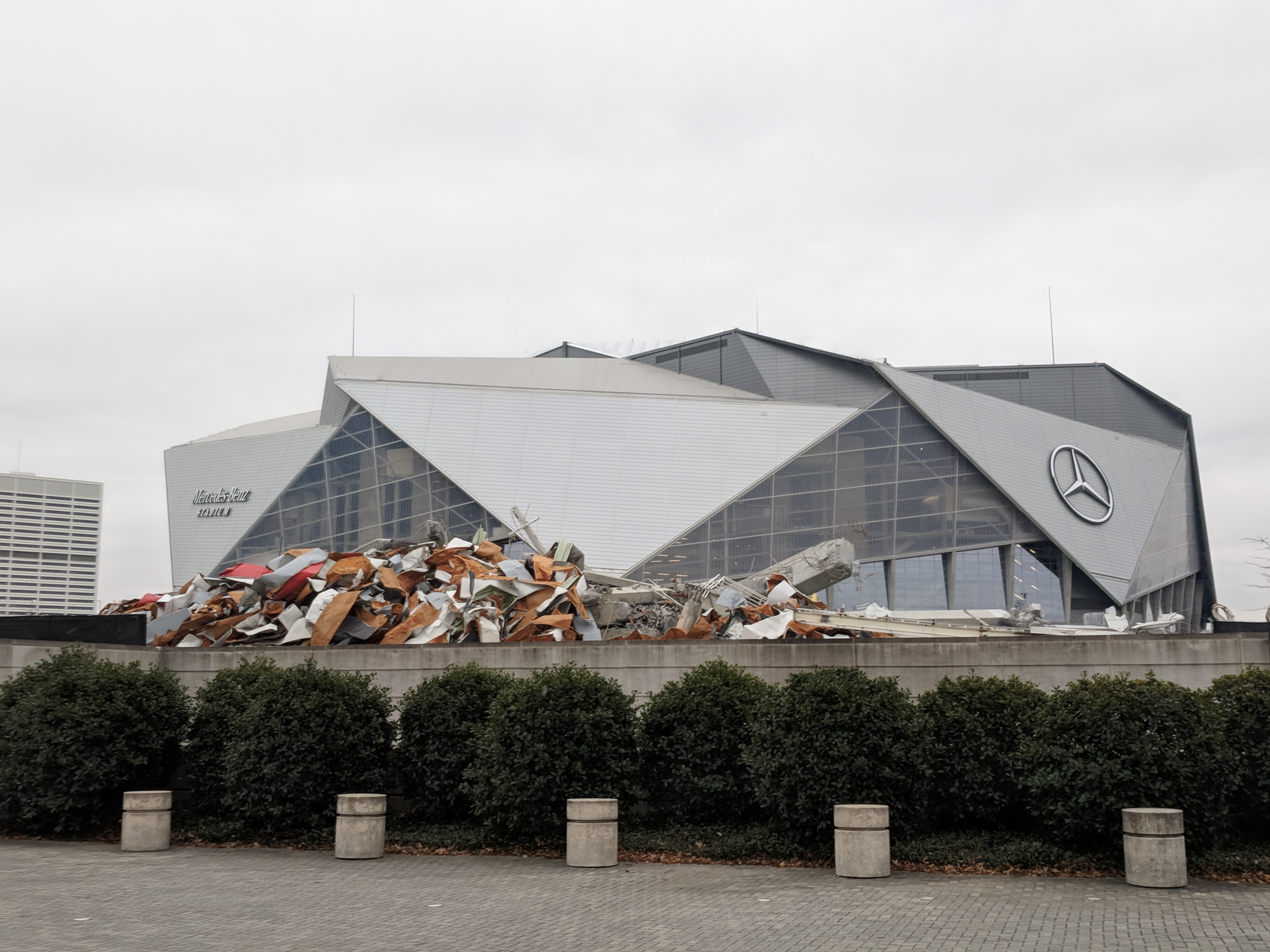
The remains of the Dome with Mercedes-Benz Stadium in the background.

Due to the large exclusion zone required for the demolition, no public viewing areas were made available; additionally, Metropolitan Atlanta Rapid Transit Authority officials announced that rail service west of the Five Points station would be suspended on the day of demolition until MARTA safety inspectors certified that the tunnels which run below the Dome site were safe for trains to operate. GWCCA officials stated that the implosion would be broadcast live by WSB-TV as well as livestreamed on the official websites of the Falcons, Atlanta United FC, and Mercedes-Benz Stadium. Live coverage of the implosion on the Weather Channel was blocked at the last moment by a MARTA bus that stopped in front of the camera just seconds before the implosion.

While the implosion was considered successful with the roof and a majority of the structure felled, the eastern wall and the northwest gate of the Dome were left standing after the implosion. Although the Dome's proximity to adjacent structures was a major concern, with Mercedes-Benz Stadium only 83 feet (25 m) away from the Dome, demolition officials stated that bringing the roof down was the biggest challenge due to its unique design. The Georgia World Congress Center and Mercedes-Benz Stadium were undamaged during the first implosion, although the new stadium did receive a heavy dusting. Initially, demolition officials stated that the two remaining sections would be brought down manually with hydraulic excavators; however, after inspections determined that the explosive charges did not detonate, a supplementary implosion took place on the morning of December 20 at 1:00 am EST. A window at one of the GWCC buildings was shattered during the second implosion but was quickly replaced.

Following the implosion, most of the concrete from the Georgia Dome remained on site, crushed into smaller pieces to be used as infill material while steel and other materials were separated and recycled. Most of the Georgia Dome site became greenspace for tailgating at Mercedes-Benz Stadium and other community events. On April 21, 2017, GWCCA officials announced that The Home Depot acquired the naming rights to the 13-acre (53,000 m^{2}) park prior to its construction, adopting the name of "The Home Depot Backyard". Cleanup of debris from the Georgia Dome site was completed by late February 2018 with construction of the Home Depot Backyard beginning shortly thereafter; the new park officially opened on September 11, 2018. Ground was broken for a new high-rise convention center hotel on May 19, 2021, which opened in January 2024. The hotel is located between the Home Depot Backyard and GWCC Building C, and is the first newly constructed hotel for Hilton's Signia brand.

A historical marker erected by the GWCCA and the Georgia Historical Society commemorating the Georgia Dome's legacy was dedicated on September 6, 2018.

== Events hosted ==
=== Football ===
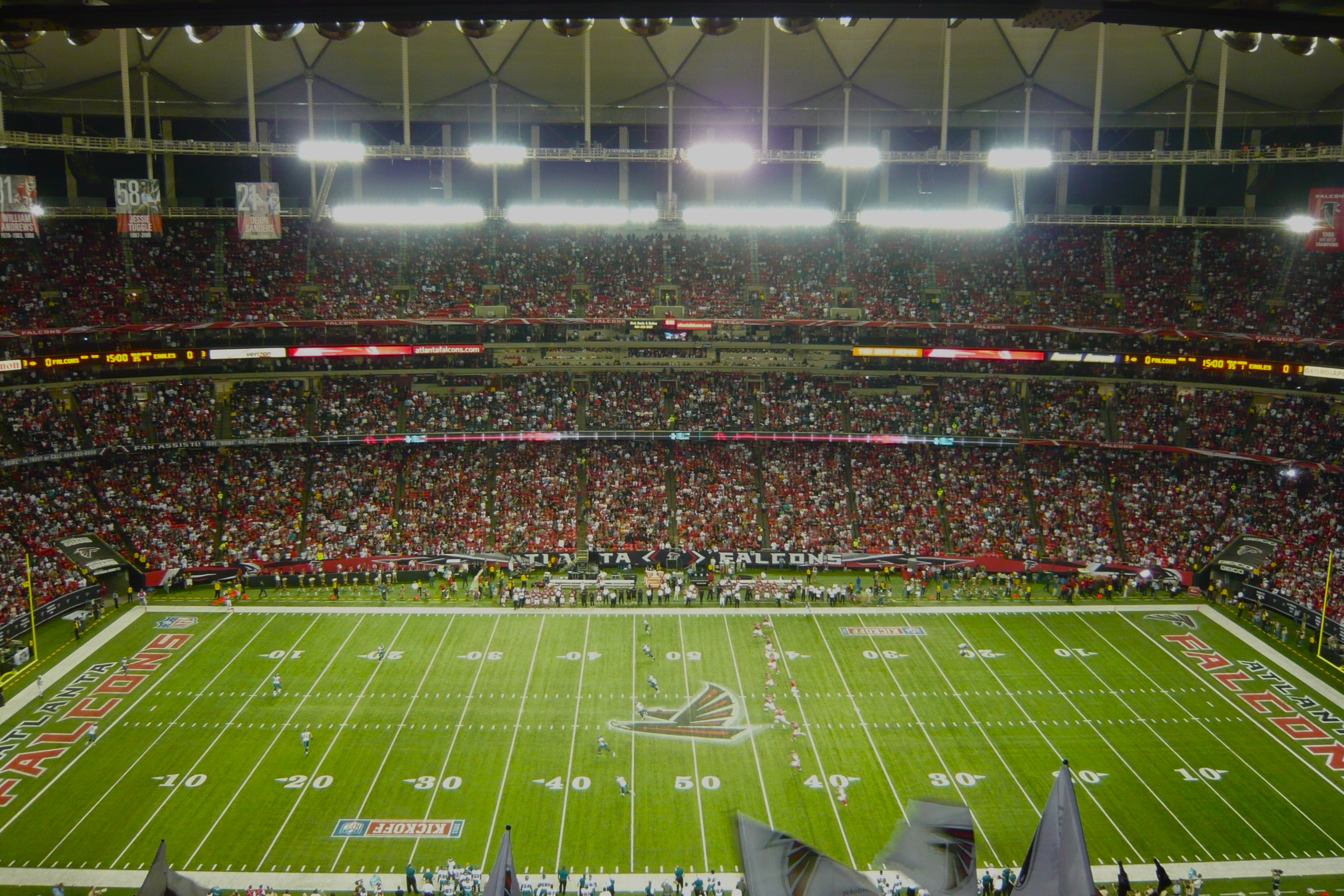
The Falcons hosting the Philadelphia Eagles in 2011

The Dome was home to the NFL's Atlanta Falcons. The stadium also hosted Super Bowl XXVIII in 1994 and Super Bowl XXXIV in 2000. The Falcons failed to qualify for the playoffs both seasons that the Dome hosted the Super Bowl; despite a 14–2 regular season in 1998 which was capped off with a Super Bowl appearance, the Falcons slumped to a 5–11 record in 1999. The final NFL Game at the Georgia Dome was the 2016 NFC Championship Game between the Falcons and the Green Bay Packers, won by the Falcons 44–21 to advance to their second Super Bowl in franchise history.

The Dome was also the annual host (since 1998) to FCS Classic football game between Florida A&M Rattlers and another HBCU opponent (Southern Jaguars in 2011 and Tennessee State Tigers in prior years), and the annual host to the Southeastern Conference Football Championship Game and the Chick-fil-A Bowl (also known as the Peach Bowl) post-season college football games. From 2015 to 2016, the Dome hosted the Celebration Bowl, the annual post-season bowl match up between the MEAC and SWAC. On January 2, 2006, the Georgia Dome hosted the Nokia Sugar Bowl, between the University of Georgia and West Virginia University. The game was held in Atlanta, Georgia, since the game's usual venue, the Louisiana Superdome, was unable host due to damage caused by Hurricane Katrina.

From the program's inception in 2010 until 2016, the stadium was home of the NCAA Division I Georgia State Panthers of Georgia State University. Subsequently, with the Dome's impending closure, the university acquired the Atlanta Braves' former Turner Field baseball park and renovated it to Center Parc Stadium for college football.

The Georgia Dome also annually hosted the Georgia High School Association (GHSA) football semi-finals until 2007 and hosted the football state championships from 2008 to 2016.

=== Basketball ===
The Georgia Dome hosted the NCAA Final Four Men's Basketball National Championship in 2002, 2007, and 2013, along with regional semi-finals and finals in 2001, 2004, 2006 and 2012 and NCAA Women's Final Four in 2003. The SEC men's basketball tournament has been held at the Georgia Dome during 10 seasons, most recently in 2014. The ACC men's basketball tournament has been held at the Georgia Dome on two occasions, in 2001 and 2009. The NCAA Division I Basketball's Champions Classic was held at the dome in 2012.

It was also one of two homes, along with the facility then known as Alexander Memorial Coliseum, for the NBA's Atlanta Hawks during the construction of State Farm Arena from 1997 to 1999 on the site of the former Omni Coliseum. While playing at the Georgia Dome on March 27, 1998, the Atlanta Hawks set a then-NBA single-game attendance record with 62,046 fans against Michael Jordan and the Chicago Bulls.

=== Olympics ===
For the 1996 Summer Olympics, one half of the arena hosted the basketball competitions (including final) while the other half hosted the artistic gymnastics events and team handball (men's final).

=== Soccer ===
The Georgia Dome held a number of international soccer matches. On June 24, 2009, the Dome hosted its first ever soccer match between Mexico and Venezuela in front of 51,115 fans, with grass laid over the FieldTurf. On February 9, 2011, Mexico and Bosnia and Herzegovina played a friendly match in front of 50,507 fans. On July 20, 2013, the Dome hosted two quarter-final match-ups of the 2013 Gold Cup—Panama vs. Cuba and Mexico vs. Trinidad & Tobago—in front of 54,229 fans.

The stadium was an official candidate venue for hosting matches as part of the United States' bid for the 2022 FIFA World Cup, but Qatar was selected to host the tournament.

=== Other events ===
The Georgia Dome was also a prominent stop for many music acts including Alabama, Guns N' Roses, U2, Kiss, The Rolling Stones, Elton John, Billy Joel, Taylor Swift, Chuck Berry, Smash Mouth, The Beach Boys, Kid Rock, Phil Collins, Backstreet Boys, Korn, Metallica, Skillet, Beyoncé, One Direction, Jay-Z and many more. It was also home to the video game convention E3 from 1997 to 1998. In 1998, Gaither Homecoming hosted two Homecoming concerts, Atlanta Homecoming and All Day Singin' At The Dome.

Date	Winning Team	Result	Losing Team	Tournament	Spectators
June 24, 2009	Mexico	4–0	Venezuela	International Friendly	51,115
February 9, 2011	Mexico	2–0	Bosnia and Herzegovina	International Friendly	50,507
July 20, 2013	Panama	6–1	Cuba	2013 CONCACAF Gold Cup Quarterfinals	54,229
July 20, 2013	Mexico	1–0	Trinidad and Tobago	2013 CONCACAF Gold Cup Quarterfinals	54,229
February 13, 2014	United States women	8–0	Russia women	Women's International Friendly	16,133
March 5, 2014	Mexico	0–0	Nigeria	International Friendly	59,066
July 22, 2015	Jamaica	2–1	United States	2015 CONCACAF Gold Cup Semifinals	70,511
July 22, 2015	Mexico	2–1	Panama	2015 CONCACAF Gold Cup Semifinals	70,511
May 28, 2016	Mexico	1–0	Paraguay	International Friendly	63,049
September 18, 2016	United States women	3–1	Netherlands women	Women's International Friendly	15,652

=== Drum Corps International ===
The stadium also hosted the Drum Corps International (DCI) Southeastern Championship from 2006 to 2016. The inaugural event featured 22 drum corps in the old fashioned Prelims/Finals one-day format. During the competition, the stadium was the first, and only indoor rain delay, when an upper deck rain gutter leaked inside the stadium. The 2006 competition was won by The Cavaliers, becoming the first of only four corps to win in the 11 years the stadium hosted the event.

From 2007 to 2014, the Blue Devils would win an unprecedented 8 straight victories at the annual Southeastern Championship. The win streak would be snapped in 2015 by Carolina Crown with its fan-favorite production of "Inferno"

With the announcement of the Mercedes-Benz Stadium to be opened in the summer of 2017, the 2016 tour season would be the last hurrah inside the dome. Though the 2016 season would be the last in the dome, it would prove to be a historical one at that, with the Bluecoats powering their way to the top to win the last competition in the stadium, bringing the corps' first Southeast Championship and later on their first DCI World Championship Title.

While the 2017 show was scheduled to be in the new Mercedes-Benz Stadium, construction delays would make the venue not ready for the July 29 event, which would find a temporary home at McEachern High School in Powder Springs. DCI hosted the 2018 and 2019 Southeast Championships at the new stadium.

=== Wrestling ===
The Georgia Dome hosted WrestleMania XXVII on April 3, 2011, as well as WrestleMania Axxess in the Georgia World Congress Center; WrestleMania XXVII was the last WWE event held in the Georgia Dome.

WCW Monday Nitro was hosted in the Georgia Dome twice in 1998 and twice again in 1999; WWE Monday Night Raw was hosted 4 times in the stadium between 1999 and 2001.

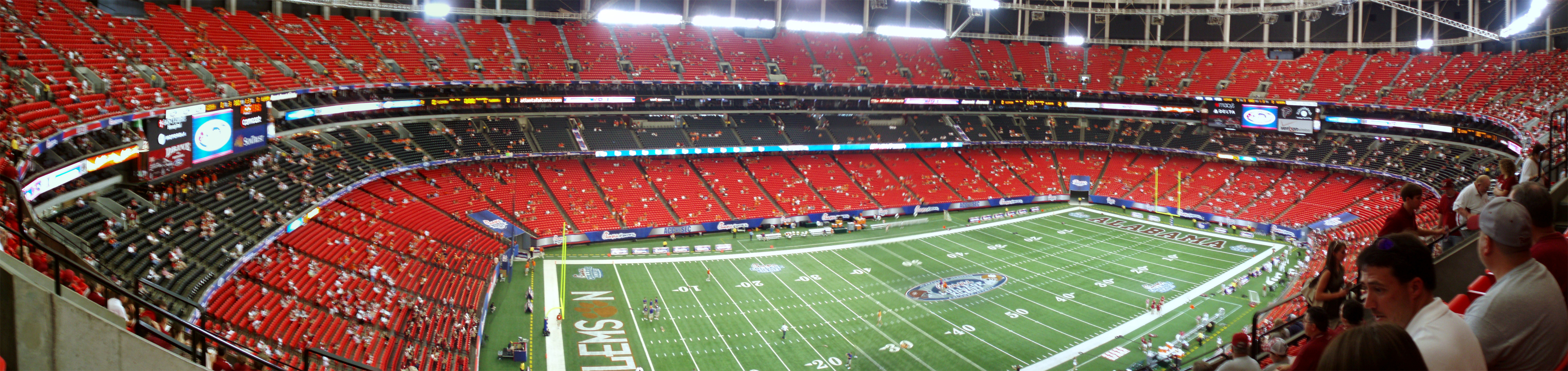
The interior of the Georgia Dome prior to the 2008 Chick-fil-A Kickoff Game

== See also ==
- Tension fabric building
- Tensile structure

Events and tenants
Preceded by Atlanta–Fulton County Stadium	Home of the Atlanta Falcons; 1992 – 2017	Succeeded by Mercedes-Benz Stadium
Preceded by Omni Coliseum	Home of the Atlanta Hawks; 1997 – 1999	Succeeded by Philips Arena
Preceded by First stadium	Home of the Georgia State Panthers football team 2010 – 2016	Succeeded by Georgia State Stadium
Preceded by Legion Field	Home of the SEC Championship Game; 1994 – 2016	Succeeded by Mercedes-Benz Stadium
Preceded by Atlanta–Fulton County Stadium	Home of the Chick-fil-A Peach Bowl; 1993 – 2016	Succeeded by Mercedes-Benz Stadium
Preceded by Louisiana Superdome	Home of the Sugar Bowl; 2006	Succeeded by Louisiana Superdome
Preceded by H.H.H. Metrodome; RCA Dome; Mercedes-Benz Superdome	NCAA Men's Division I Basketball tournament Finals Venue; 2002; 2007; 2013	Succeeded by Louisiana Superdome; Alamodome; AT&T Stadium
Preceded by Rose Bowl; Pro Player Stadium	Host of the Super Bowl; XXVIII 1994; XXXIV 2000	Succeeded by Joe Robbie Stadium; Raymond James Stadium
Preceded by University of Phoenix Stadium	Host of WrestleMania; 2011 (XXVII)	Succeeded by Sun Life Stadium
Preceded by Candlestick Park; Bank of America Stadium	Host of NFC Championship Game; 2013; 2017	Succeeded by CenturyLink Field; Lincoln Financial Field
Preceded by Reliant Park	Host of FIRST Robotics World Championship; 2004–2010	Succeeded by Edward Jones Dome
