= Cord Parks =

American football player (born 1986)

No. 29, 23, 26
- Position: Cornerback

Personal information
- Born: November 12, 1986 (age 40); Decatur, Georgia, U.S.
- Listed height: 5 ft 11 in (1.80 m)
- Listed weight: 180 lb (82 kg)

Career information
- High school: Stone Mountain (Stone Mountain, Georgia)
- College: Northeastern

Career history
- 2009: St. Louis Rams
- 2010: Seattle Seahawks*
- 2010–2011: Minnesota Vikings*
- 2012: New Orleans Saints*
- 2013–2015: BC Lions
- 2016: Edmonton Eskimos
- * Offseason or practice squad member only

Career NFL statistics
- Total tackles: 1
- Stats at Pro Football Reference
- Stats at CFL.ca

Cordelius Jamerr Parks (born November 12, 1986) is an American former professional football player who was a cornerback in the National Football League (NFL) and Canadian Football League (CFL). He was picked up on waivers by the Seattle Seahawks on June 16, 2010. He was signed by the St. Louis Rams as an undrafted free agent in 2009. He played college football for the Northeastern Huskies.

== Early life ==
Parks played four years of football at Stone Mountain High School in Stone Mountain, Georgia, where he was the team captain as a junior and senior. He earned second-team All-County honors as a senior. In addition to being a running back and defensive back, he also ran track for three years, finishing third in the 110-meter and the 300-meter hurdles at the county championship.

== College career ==
Parks, in 2008, started all 12 games at cornerback for Northeastern and made 54 tackles, forced a fumble, recovered a fumble and defensed four passes. In 2007, he started in 11 games at cornerback and was third on the team in tackles (63), first in interceptions (2) and deflected four passes. He also returned 20 kickoffs for a 21.0 yard average. As a sophomore in 2006, he totaled 40 tackles with four deflections and had a 22.0-yard average on 21 kickoff returns. In 2005, he played in 11 games, making 14 tackles.

Parks competed on the track team in 2005, 2006, and 2007 in the 100 meters, 110 hurdles, and the 4x100 relay, placing high in the CAA Championships.

== Professional career ==
=== St. Louis Rams ===
Parks was signed by the St. Louis Rams as an undrafted free agent on April 29, 2009. He was promoted to the active roster after spending most of the season on the practice squad on December 26.

=== Seattle Seahawks ===
Parks Spent a Short time on the Seahawks Practice Roster in 2010 before being Released after week 5

=== Minnesota Vikings ===
Parks spent the 2010 season on the Vikings practice-squad. After being signed to their 2011 offseason roster, had an outstanding Preseason with the Vikings but was released due to injury after the final Preseason game.

=== New Orleans Saints ===
Parks participated in training camp with the New Orleans Saints and was cut on August 27, 2012.

=== BC Lions ===
Parks played for the BC Lions from 2013 to 2015.

=== Edmonton Eskimos ===
Parks signed with the Edmonton Eskimos on May 26, 2016.
