= D. Richard Hipp =

American software developer

- Hipp in 2008
- Born: Dwayne Richard Hipp; April 9, 1961 (age 65); Charlotte, North Carolina, US
- Education: Georgia Institute of Technology (BS); Duke University (PhD)
- Known for: SQLite, Fossil, Lemon, Pikchr
- Spouse: Ginger G. Wyrick (m. 1994)
- Awards: Google-O'Reilly Open Source Award
- Website: www.hwaci.com/drh

Dwayne Richard Hipp (born April 9, 1961) is an American software developer and the primary author of SQLite, the Fossil SCM, and Pikchr. He also authored the Lemon parser generator, and CVSTrac; the latter became the inspiration for Trac. He was also a member of the Tcl core team.

== Life and career ==
Hipp was born in Charlotte, North Carolina, on April 9, 1961, but grew up in the suburbs of Atlanta, Georgia. He graduated from Stone Mountain High School in 1979 and enrolled at Georgia Tech. He graduated from Georgia Tech in 1984 with Master of Science in Electrical Engineering.

After graduating from Georgia Tech, Hipp worked at AT&T for three years before returning to graduate school at Duke University to study under Alan W. Biermann in the Department of Computer Science. He earned a Doctor of Philosophy from Duke in 1992 and, finding the academic market for PhDs saturated with what he believed to be better qualified candidates, started his own software development consulting company. He designed SQLite in the spring of 2000 while working for General Dynamics on contract with the United States Navy.

He married Ginger G. Wyrick on April 16, 1994, changed the name of his company to Hipp, Wyrick & Company, Inc, abbreviated as Hwaci (pronounced /ˈhwɑːtʃiː/) - and signed all stock over to Wyrick. He and his wife moved to their present home in Charlotte, North Carolina in August 1995.

== See also ==
- SQLite
- List of Georgia Institute of Technology alumni
- List of Duke University people
