= Deltalina =

American flight attendant

Katherine Lee-Hinton
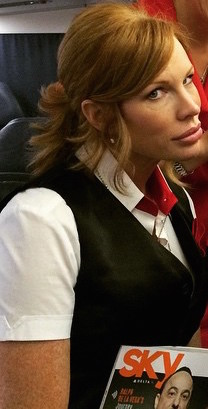
- Deltalina in 2015
- Born: Katherine Lee; 1974 or 1975 (age 50–51); Heidelberg, Baden-Württemberg, West Germany
- Education: Stone Mountain High School
- Occupations: Flight attendant and flight attendant instructor for Delta Air Lines
- Years active: 1997–present

Katherine Lee-Hinton, better known as Deltalina, is a German-born American flight attendant for Delta Air Lines who has appeared in several Delta onboard safety videos. The first Deltalina safety video was released in February 2008 and became one of the most-watched videos on YouTube at the time.

The nickname Deltalina came from YouTube viewers who, in the comments on the 2008 video, compared her looks to those of actress Angelina Jolie.

== Early life ==
Katherine Lee was born in Heidelberg, Germany to a family of the military and is of Puerto Rican ancestry on her father's side and German ancestry on her mother's side. An alumna of Stone Mountain High School, class of 1992, she was hired by Delta in 1997 upon her first attempt to join the airline. She resided in Melbourne, Florida in 1997 and Buckhead, Atlanta as of 2008.

== Safety videos ==
The original 2008 safety video was featured on several news outlets such as USA Today, CNN, Wired, De Telegraaf, De Standaard and Het Nieuwsblad, noting that the unusual humor might make passengers pay more attention to the video.

=== Critical reception ===
Martin Grant of Forbes wrote in 2012 that the Deltalina video was the first of the "next generation of safety video" and that the "talents" of Deltalina "largely helped" this.

This video, however, was panned in the book How to Do Things With Videogames by Ian Bogost because, in Bogost's opinion, the attention that is paid to the videos is given to Lee-Hinton and not to the actual safety instructions, that the video made her into "a minor celebrity", that "In a weird historical inversion, this very much is your father's Pan Am."

=== Subsequent Delta safety videos ===
- In late 2012, Delta Air Lines made two new safety videos in which Lee-Hinton is not the presenter, but in which she does appear in a cameo role, admonishing against smoking on board with her famous finger wag.
- In 2014, a younger version of Deltalina did her "finger wag" in a 1980s-themed safety video.
- In 2015, Lee-Hinton again did her "finger wag", this time admonishing a screaming goat not to smoke, in a safety video featuring Internet memes. This scene later returned in a 2016 Delta safety video.
- In 2025, she made an appearance as a passenger in a safety video celebrating the airline's centennial. In this video, she taps a fellow passenger on the shoulder to remind him that smoking is not allowed.

== List of public appearances ==
- 2006: Lee modeled from May to September 2006 presentations and photo sessions for new Delta Air Lines' flight attendant uniforms.
- 2007: Lee appeared giving a live safety briefing in the May 22, 2007 episode of The Ellen DeGeneres Show when the entire show took place aboard a Delta flight.
- 2008: In September, Lee shot a series of humorous instructional videos for the Atlanta Falcons football team, shown on the large screens at the Georgia Dome in advance of each home game. The videos' theme was "Delta Safety First".
- 2009: In March, Lee helped celebrate the opening of the heliport atop the W Hotel in Downtown Atlanta, accompanying developer Hal Barry and his wife in a helicopter which landed there, kicking off the party. Barry intended to commute between downtown and his estate 50 miles (80 km) further south. In the same month Lee appeared both in print and video to help kick off the relaunch of Delta's inflight magazine, Sky.
- 2010: Lee appeared in a video for the Carter Center. Also in that year, she did a video to promote Sky Priority benefits for frequent flyers.
- 2011: In March, Lee appeared in a video for the 2011 Adobe Summit orientation. In August 2011, Lee appeared in a series of promotional videos for Healthe Trim's diet supplements. On December 14, 2011, she also appeared on CNN offering travel tips.
- 2012: In March, Lee was onstage at the 23rd Annual GLAAD Media Awards. In November 2012, she appeared in a print ad for the Atlanta Convention and Visitors Bureau, which appeared in Delta Sky Magazine. In the same month she also appeared in a cameo role in a promotional video for the Atlanta Convention and Visitors Bureau.

== Personal life ==
Lee was born in Heidelberg, Baden-Württemberg, Germany, to a Puerto Rican father, who died in December 2013, and a German mother. Her father was in the military, and her family moved around a lot. Lee graduated from Stone Mountain High School in Metro Atlanta in 1992. She is fluent in German and English.
