= Kelly Quinn =

American football player (born 1963)

No. 92
- Position: Linebacker

Personal information
- Born: August 20, 1963 (age 63); Thomaston, Georgia, U.S.
- Listed height: 6 ft 1 in (1.85 m)
- Listed weight: 220 lb (100 kg)

Career information
- High school: Stone Mountain
- College: Michigan State
- NFL draft: 1986: undrafted

Career history
- Winnipeg Blue Bombers (1986); Minnesota Vikings (1987); Detroit Drive (1988)

Awards and highlights
- ArenaBowl champion (1988)
- Stats at Pro Football Reference

Kelly B. Quinn (born August 20, 1963) is an American former professional football player who was a linebacker who played for the Minnesota Vikings of the National Football League (NFL). He played college football for the Michigan State Spartans.
