= Stone Mountain High School =

College preparatory and public high school in DeKalb County, Georgia, United States

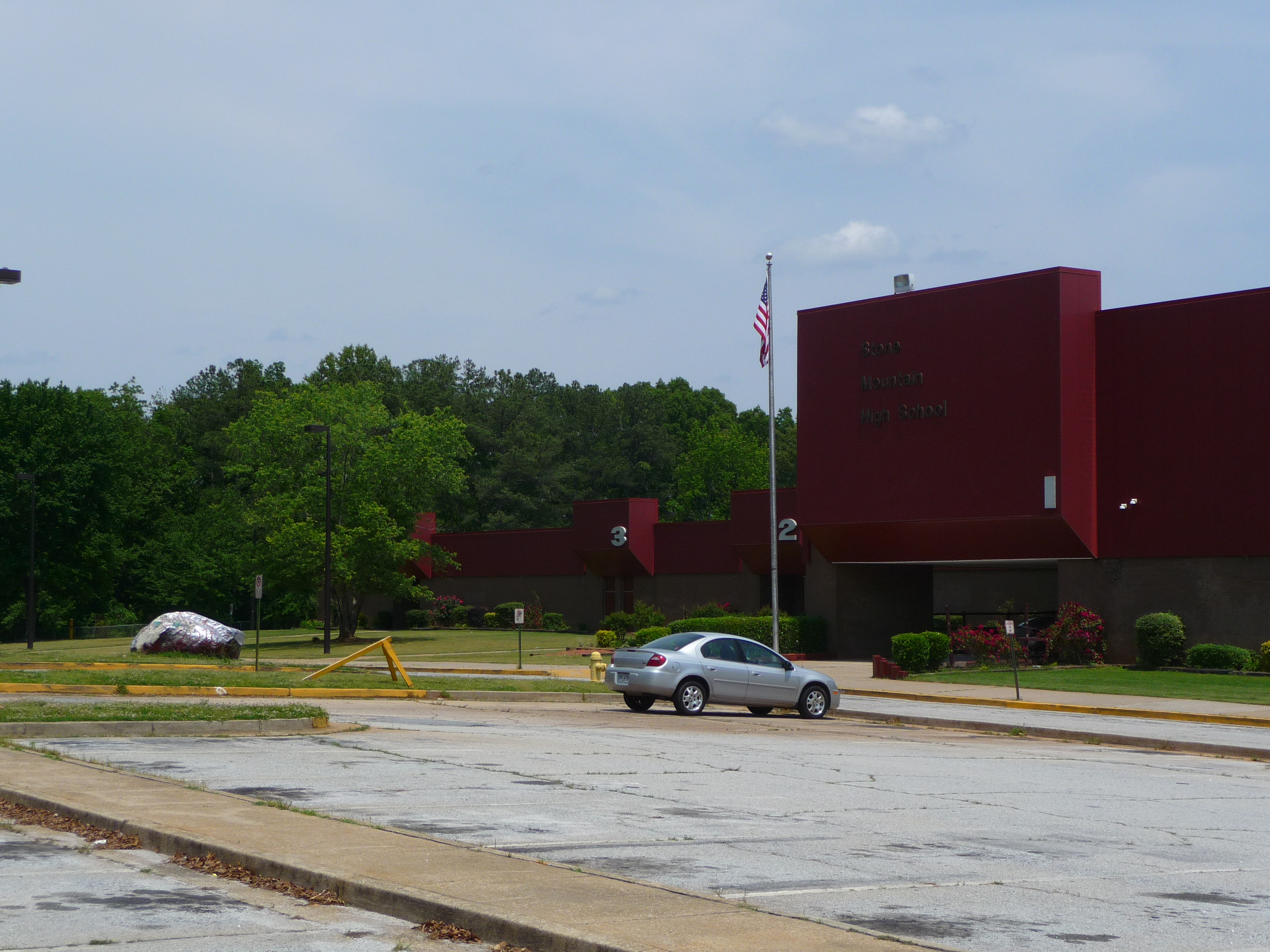

Location
- 4555 Central Drive; Stone Mountain, Georgia 30083; United States
- 33°48′38″N 84°12′07″W

Information
- Type: Public
- Motto: "Raising the Bar: No Exceptions!"
- Established: 1909
- School district: DeKalb County School District
- Principal: Rickey Wright Jr
- Teaching staff: 67.00 (FTE)
- Grades: 9–12
- Enrollment: 1,206 (2023–2024)
- Student to teacher ratio: 18.00
- Campus: Suburban
- Colors: Black & Red
- Mascot: Pirate
- Accreditation: Southern Association of Colleges and Schools
- Website: Stone Mountain High School

Stone Mountain High School is a college preparatory and public high school located in unincorporated DeKalb County, Georgia, United States, near Stone Mountain and in the Atlanta metropolitan area.

Its attendance boundary includes all of Stone Mountain.

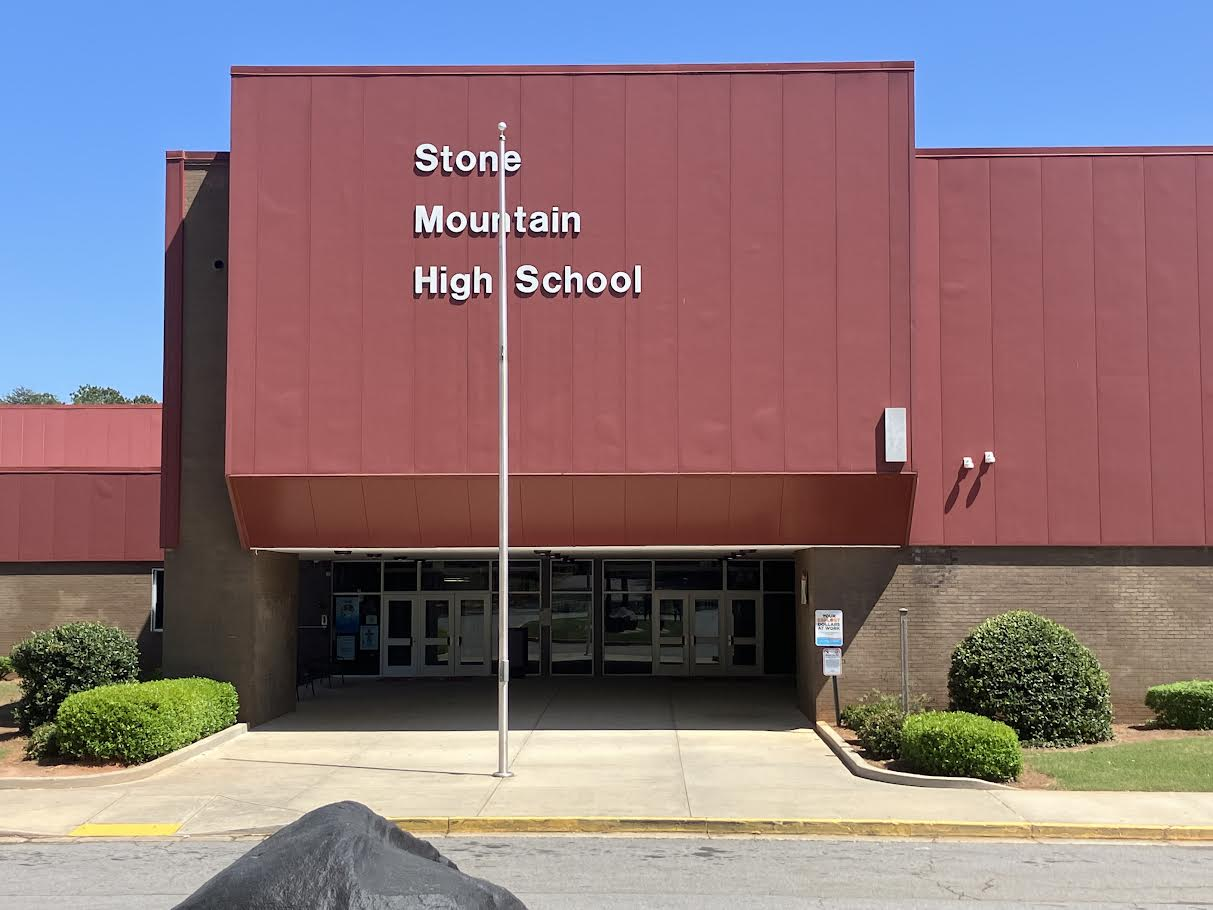
Front of School (April 2025)

== History ==
It is one of the oldest high schools in the DeKalb County School District.

== Notable alumni ==
- Jarren Benton, professional rapper
- 6lack, professional rapper, singer, and songwriter
- Robert Carswell, former professional football player for the San Diego Chargers
- Callix Crabbe, former professional baseball player for the San Diego Padres
- Ukeme Eligwe, professional football player for the Kansas City Chiefs
- Fast Life Yungstaz, Rap trio
- Andrew Goudelock (born 1988), basketball player for Maccabi Tel Aviv of the Israeli Premier League and the Euroleague
- Tamyra Gray, actress and singer, top ten finalist on American Idol
- D. Richard Hipp, software developer and the primary author of SQLite and Fossil SCM
- Connie Johnson, former professional baseball player for the Chicago White Sox and Baltimore Orioles
- RonReaco Lee, Actor, Sister Sister, Guess Who, Survivor's Remorse
- Katherine Lee-Hinton, Delta Air Lines flight attendant who was one of the presenters of Delta's onboard safety videos and quickly became popular not only on board but also on YouTube soon after.
- Cord Parks, former professional football player
- Kelly Quinn, former professional football player
- Damon Russell, Oscar winning producer Curfew, Director of Snow on da Bluff
- Mitch Sutton, former professional football player
- Swizz Beatz, record producer
- Josh Symonette, football player
- Hugh Thompson, Jr., United States Army, Vietnam War veteran who attempted to stop the My Lai Massacre
