= Ben Hawkes =

Computer security expert and white hat hacker, was employed by Goggle for a project

Ben Hawkes is a computer security expert and white hat hacker from New Zealand, previously employed by Google as manager of their Project Zero.

Hawkes has been credited with finding dozens of flaws in computer software, such as within Adobe Flash, Microsoft Office, Apple's iOS and the Linux kernel. His role was acknowledged, for instance, in an Adobe 2015 security bulletin, which announced updates that addressed critical vulnerabilities that allowed hackers to take control of the affected system. In 2019, he reported two vulnerabilities that could allow hackers to tap iPhone microphones and spy on calls.

Before Hawkes became part of Project Zero, he was first part of the Google team tasked with the security of Google's product launches. Hawkes regularly publishes research on his works, particularly on vulnerability analysis and software exploitation such as novel heap exploitation techniques on Windows.
