= David M. Beazley =

American software engineer

David Beazley
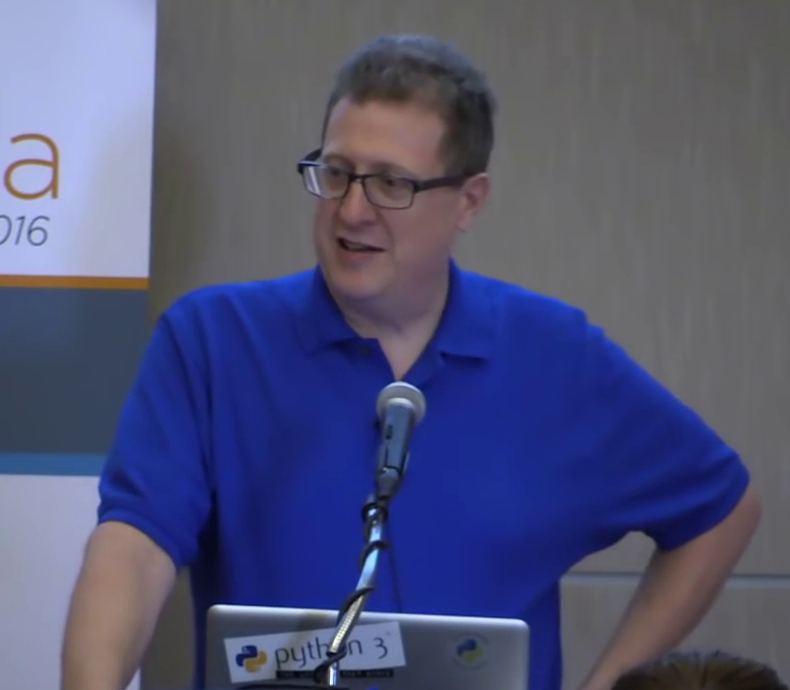
- Beazley speaking at PyData Chicago in 2016
- Citizenship: United States
- Education: Fort Lewis College (BA); University of Oregon (MS); University of Utah (Ph.D.)
- Known for: Python Essential Reference, SWIG, PLY
- Awards: IEEE Gordon Bell Prize (1993, 1998); PyCon Best Paper Award (2001); Fellow, Python Software Foundation (2002)
- Scientific career
- Fields: Computer Science
- Workplaces: Scientific Computing and Imaging Institute; Los Alamos National Laboratory, University of Chicago; Dabeaz LLC
- Thesis: A wrapper generation tool for the creation of scriptable scientific applications (1998)
- Doctoral advisor: Christopher R. Johnson
- Website: http://www.dabeaz.com/blog.html

David Beazley is an American software engineer. He has made significant contributions to the Python developer community, which includes writing the definitive Python reference text Python Essential Reference, the SWIG software tool for creating language agnostic C and C++ extensions, and the PLY parsing tool. He has served on the program committees for PyCon and the O'Reilly Open Source Convention, and was elected a fellow of the Python Software Foundation in 2002.

== Biography ==
Beazley received his BA from Fort Lewis College in 1991 and his MS from the University of Oregon in 1993, both in mathematics. He then joined the PhD program in computer science at the University of Utah and worked at the Scientific Computing and Imaging Institute. During his PhD, he worked in the Theoretical Physics Division at Los Alamos National Laboratory, where he helped develop high-performance simulation software for parallel computing. He was the primary developer of SPaSM (Scalable Parallel Short-range Molecular dynamics), for which he won the ACM Gordon Bell Prize in 1993 and in 1998.

Following his PhD in 1998, he joined the Computer Science Department at the University of Chicago, and received a National Science Foundation CAREER Awards to investigate the development of mixed-language software tools. He won the Best Paper Award at PyCon 2001 for developing the Wrapped Application Debugger (WAD), which converts fatal exception errors into Python exceptions. In 2005, he left the University to start a consulting company, Dabeaz LLC, to focus on developing Python tools and learning resources.

David Beazley currently maintains a YouTube channel, with approximately 17,500 subscribers. David is also known for a 67-hour video released in 2026. His most popular video currently has approximately 127 thousand views.

== Books ==
- Beazley, David M. (2009). Python Essential Reference (4th ed.). Upper Saddle River, NJ: Addison-Wesley. ISBN 978-0672329784.
- Beazley, David; Jones, Brian K. (2013). Python Cookbook (3rd ed.). Beijing: O'Reilly. ISBN 978-1449340377.
- Beazley, David (2021). Python Distilled. Addison-Wesley. ISBN 978-0134173276.
