= PLY (software) =

Re-implementation of Lex and Yacc in Python

PLY (Python Lex-Yacc)
- Original author: David M. Beazley
- Stable release: 3.11
- Repository: github.com/dabeaz/ply
- Written in: Python
- Website: dabeaz.com/ply/

PLY is a parsing tool written purely in Python. It is, in essence, a re-implementation of Lex and Yacc originally in C-language. It was written by David M. Beazley. PLY uses the same LALR parsing technique as Lex and Yacc. It also has extensive debugging and error reporting facilities.

== Features ==
Implemented in Python, it has almost all the features provided by Lex and Yacc. It includes support for empty productions, precedence rules, error recovery, and ambiguous grammars. It supports Python 3.

== Structure the PLY module ==
PLY has the following two Python modules which are part of the ply package.

- ply.lex - A re-implementation of Lex for lexical analysis
- ply.yacc - A re-implementation of Yacc for parser creation
