= Project Zero =

Security analysis team employed by Google

- Developer: Google
- Website: googleprojectzero.blogspot.com

Project Zero is a team of security analysts employed by Google tasked with finding zero-day vulnerabilities. It was announced on 15 July 2014.

== History ==
After finding a number of flaws in software used by many end-users while researching other problems, such as the critical "Heartbleed" vulnerability, Google decided to form a full-time team dedicated to finding such vulnerabilities, not only in Google software but any software used by its users. The new project was announced on 15 July 2014 on Google's security blog. When it launched, one of the principal innovations that Project Zero provided was a strict 90-day disclosure deadline along with a publicly visible bugtracker where the vulnerability disclosure process is documented.

While the idea for Project Zero can be traced back to 2010, its establishment fits into the larger trend of Google's counter-surveillance initiatives in the wake of the 2013 global surveillance disclosures by Edward Snowden. The team was formerly headed by Chris Evans, previously head of Google's Chrome security team, who subsequently joined Tesla Motors. Other notable members include security researchers Ben Hawkes, Ian Beer and Tavis Ormandy. Hawkes eventually became the team's manager and then resigned on 4 May 2022.

The team's focus is not just on finding bugs and novel attacks, but also on researching and publicly documenting how such flaws could be exploited in practice. This is done to ensure that defenders have sufficient understanding of attacks; the team keeps an extensive research blog with articles that describe individual attacks in detail.

== Bug finding and reporting ==
Bugs found by the Project Zero team are reported to the manufacturer and only made publicly visible once a patch has been released or if 90 days have passed without a patch being released. The 90-day-deadline is Google's way of implementing responsible disclosure, giving software companies 90 days to fix a problem before informing the public so that users themselves can take necessary steps to avoid attacks. There have been cases where the vendor does not produce any solution for the discovered flaws within 90 days, before the public disclosure by the team, increasing the risk to already-vulnerable users.

== Notable members ==
- Ian Beer
- Jann Horn
- Natalie Silvanovich
- James Forshaw

=== Past members ===
- Ben Hawkes
- Tavis Ormandy
- Gal Beniamini
- Thomas Dullien
- Chris Evans
- George Hotz
- Matt Tait
- Steven Vittitoe
- Ned Williamson
- Felix Wilhelm
- Maddie Stone

== Notable discoveries ==
- One of the first Project Zero reports that attracted attention involved a flaw that allowed hackers to take control of software running the Safari browser. For its efforts, the team, specifically Beer, was cited in Apple's brief note of thanks.
- On 30 September 2014, Google detected a security flaw within Windows 8.1's system call "NtApphelpCacheControl", which allows a normal user to gain administrative access. Microsoft was notified of the problem immediately but did not fix the problem within 90 days, which meant information about the bug was made publicly available on 29 December 2014. Releasing the bug to the public elicited a response from Microsoft that they are working on the problem.
- On 9 March 2015, Google Project Zero's blog posted a guest post that disclosed how a previously known hardware flaw in commonly deployed DRAM called Row Hammer could be exploited to escalate privileges for local users. This post spawned a large quantity of follow-up research both in the academic and hardware community.
- On 19 February 2017, Google discovered a flaw within Cloudflare's reverse proxies, which caused their edge servers to run past the end of a buffer and return memory that contained private information such as HTTP cookies, authentication tokens, HTTP POST bodies, and other sensitive data. Some of this data was cached by search engines. A member of the Project Zero team referred to this flaw as Cloudbleed.
- On 27 March 2017, Tavis Ormandy of Project Zero discovered a vulnerability in the popular password manager LastPass. On 31 March 2017, LastPass announced they had fixed the problem.
- Project Zero was involved in discovering the Meltdown and Spectre vulnerabilities affecting many modern CPUs, which were discovered in mid-2017 and disclosed in early January 2018. The issue was discovered by Jann Horn independently from the other researchers who reported the security flaw and was scheduled to be published on 9 January 2018 before moving the date up because of growing speculation.
- On 1 February 2019, Project Zero reported to Apple that they had detected a set of five separate and complete iPhone exploit chains affecting iOS 10 through all versions of iOS 12 not targeting specific users but having the ability to infect any user who visited an infected site. A series of hacked sites were being used in indiscriminate watering hole attacks against their visitors which Project Zero estimated receive thousands of visitors per week. Project Zero felt the attacks indicated a group making a sustained effort to hack the users of iPhones in certain communities over a period of at least two years. Apple fixed the exploits in the release of iOS 12.1.4 on 7 February 2019, and said the fixes were already underway when reported by Project Zero.
- On 18 April 2019, Project Zero discovered a bug in Apple iMessage wherein a certain malformed message could cause Springboard to "...crash and respawn repeatedly, causing the UI not to be displayed and the phone to stop responding to input." This would completely crash the iPhone's UI making it inoperable. This bug would persist even after a hard reset. The flaw also affected iMessage on Mac with different results. Apple fixed the bug within the 90 day period before Project Zero released it.
- In December 2021, the team published a technical breakdown of the FORCEDENTRY exploit based on its collaboration with Apple’s Security Engineering and Architecture (SEAR) group.

== See also ==
- Proactive cyber defence
