= Josh Symonette =

American football player (born 1978)

No. 34, 57
- Position: Safety / Linebacker

Personal information
- Born: May 8, 1978 (age 48); Miami, Florida
- Listed height: 5 ft 10 in (1.78 m)
- Listed weight: 180 lb (82 kg)

Career information
- High school: Stone Mountain (Stone Mountain, Georgia)
- College: Tennessee Tech
- NFL draft: 2000: undrafted

Career history
- Washington Redskins (2000); Miami Dolphins (2002)*; Berlin Thunder (2003); Miami Dolphins (2003)*
- * Offseason or practice squad member only

Awards and highlights
- Second-team All-OVC (1997); 2× First-team All-OVC (1998, 1999); Third-team I-AA All-America (1999)
- Stats at Pro Football Reference

Joshua Symonette (born May 8, 1978) is an American former football safety in the National Football League for the Washington Redskins. While in Washington, Symonette made the team in 2000 as an undrafted rookie free agent. He was active for four games and recorded two special team tackles. After being released from the Redskins on September 2, 2001, he signed with the Miami Dolphins on January 15, 2002. In 2003, he played one season for the Berlin Thunder in the now defunct NFL Europe. He played college football at Tennessee Tech.

While at Tennessee Tech, Symonette was an All-Ohio Valley Conference selection each year of his career. As a freshman, he made three interceptions and earned an honorable mention selection in 1996. During his sophomore season, he was second on the team with 98 tackles and earned second-team All-OVC. During his final two seasons at Tech, Symonette recorded more than 200 tackles and two interceptions. He was a first-team All-OVC selection following both seasons. He also, holds the school record for the longest interception return, 98 yards. He was coached at Tennessee Tech by former Atlanta Falcons head coach Mike Smith.

He earned a Bachelor of Science in Interdisciplinary Studies with a concentration in English-Journalism.

He is currently a pastor at the National Community Church's Kingstowne, VA campus.
