= Berkeley Yacc =

Unix program for parser generation

- Original author: Robert Corbett
- Developer: Thomas Dickey
- Initial release: September 2, 1989; 36 years ago
- Stable release: 20241231 / 31 December 2024; 12 months ago
- Repository: invisible-mirror.net/archives/byacc/
- Written in: ANSI C89
- Operating system: Unix-like
- Type: Parser generator
- License: public domain
- Website: invisible-island.net/byacc/

Berkeley Yacc (byacc) is a Unix parser generator designed to be compatible with Yacc. It was originally written by Robert Corbett and released in 1989. Due to its liberal license and because it was faster than the AT&T Yacc, it quickly became the most popular version of Yacc. It has the advantages of being written in ANSI C89 and being public domain software.

It contains features not available in Yacc, such as reentrancy, which is implemented in a way that is broadly compatible with GNU Bison.

== History ==
In 1985, Robert Corbett developed an original LALR parser generator based on a 1982 paper by DeRemer and Pennello. Corbett wrote it as part of his research towards the Ph.D. he received from University of California, Berkeley in June 1985. It was originally named Byson and was incompatible with Yacc but it was subsequently renamed Bison and became the basis of GNU Bison.

Later in 1985, Corbett developed his LALR parser generator, making it Yacc-compatible and naming it Zeus but subsequently renaming it Zoo. Corbett published the source code for Zoo in a Usenet newsgroup but it went mostly unnoticed until later in September 1989 when Corbett posted on the comp.compilers newsgroup about putting the source code on an FTP server. There was discussion about renaming it and by October 1989 it had become known as Berkeley Yacc (byacc).

In 1995, Chris Dodd developed BtYacc, a backtracking derivative of Berkeley Yacc to support parsing context-sensitive languages like C++, based on a 1993 paper by Merrill describing similar modifications to AT&T Yacc. Its backtracking and semantic disambiguation capabilities allow it to generate parsers for ambiguous grammars. A rule parsed but rejected by semantic information can be rolled back, so that the parser can try another rule. However, it has also been criticized for needing side-effect free trial actions and its inflexible handling of shift-reduce conflicts.

In 1997, Vadim Maslov took over maintenance of BtYacc to support a COBOL parser developed by his company. By 1999, the last 3.0 release, had been converted to C++, making it no longer implemented in C.

In 2000, Thomas E. Dickey ported Berkeley Yacc to OpenVMS to facilitate porting tin to VMS. After failing to find another maintainer, Dickey has maintained Berkeley Yacc since February 2002. A significant update was the conversion from K&R C to ANSI C89.

In 2014, Tom Shields integrated BtYacc backtracking into Berkeley Yacc effectively subsuming BtYacc and again supporting C (instead of only C++) in Dickey releases since April 2014.

== Languages ==
Parser generators typically deal with three languages: the language a generator is implemented in, the language a generated parser is implemented in and of course the metalanguage that describes whatever a generated parser should parse. A fourth language could be considered whatever language a generated parser parses but parser generators do not handle such directly, instead just focusing on generating a parser from a given description while letting the generated parser deal with such. Yacc is written in C and generates parsers in C from its own Yacc metalanguage descriptions. This is also how Berkely Yacc works (thus its compatibility), however, a number of derivatives have been created to allow it to generate parsers in languages other than C.

Ray Lischner developed perl-byacc (pbyacc) from byacc 1.6, so that it could also generate parsers in Perl. Later Richard "Rick" Ohnemus ported the patches from byacc 1.6 to byacc 1.8. And later in 1996, Jake Donham developed p5yacc from perl-yacc 1.8.2 so that its generated Perl parsers would use Perl 5 classes.

In 1994, Mike Kleyn developed tyacc from perl-yacc 1.8.2 so that it could also generate parsers in Tcl

In 1997, Bob Jamison developed BYACC/Java (later called BYACC/J or byaccj) from byacc 1.8, so that it could also generate parsers in Java.

In 2000, Bruce Bahnsen merged in the Java parser capabilities of BYACC/J into perl-yacc and added the ability to generate parsers in Python. In 2013, Thomas Dickerson made further improvements on it deeming it PyByacc.

In 2003, Dave Bodenstab merged tyacc and p5yacc to develop a PERL-TCL-YACC rebasing it from 4.8 release of yacc from FreeBSD (a byacc derivative).

== See also ==
- Comparison of parser generators
