= D. J. Bleisath =

American football player (born 1979)

Profile
- Position: Offensive lineman / Defensive lineman

Personal information
- Born: September 22, 1979 (age 47); Euclid, Ohio, U.S.
- Listed height: 6 ft 3 in (1.91 m)
- Listed weight: 280 lb (127 kg)

Career information
- College: Tennessee Tech
- NFL draft: 2003: undrafted

Career history
- Oakland Raiders (2003)*; Tampa Bay Storm (2004); Chicago Rush (2005–2007)
- * Offseason or practice squad member only

Awards and highlights
- ArenaBowl champion (2006)
- Stats at ArenaFan.com

David John Bleisath (born September 22, 1979) is an American former football offensive and defensive lineman for the Chicago Rush and Tampa Bay Storm of the Arena Football League (AFL). He attended Tennessee Tech University and he was inducted to Tech's Hall of Fame in 2015. He graduated from Sequoyah High School in Canton, Georgia. After going undrafted in the 2003 NFL draft, Bleisath signed with the Oakland Raiders of the National Football League (NFL) as an undrafted free agent but was released before the regular season. In 2022 he was named to the Tennessee Tech All-100th Anniversary Football Team. Bleisath was inducted to Cherokee County Sports Hall of Fame (GA) in 2023.
