= Ragel =

Finite state machine compiler

- Developer: Adrian Thurston
- Stable release: 6.10 / March 24, 2017; 9 years ago
- Preview release: 7.0.4 / February 16, 2021; 5 years ago
- Written in: C++
- Operating system: Unix-like, Windows
- Type: State machine compiler
- License: "Ragel 6 remains under GPL v2 [generated code] covered by the MIT (or GPL v2)". Ragel 7: MIT License
- Website: www.colm.net/open-source/ragel/
- Repository: github.com/adrian-thurston/ragel

Ragel (IPA: /ˈɹeɪd͡ʒəl/) is a finite-state machine compiler and a parser generator. Initially Ragel supported output for C, C++ and Assembly source code, later expanded to support several other languages including Objective-C, D, Go, Ruby, and Java. Additional language support is also in development. It supports the generation of table or control flow driven state machines from regular expressions and/or state charts and can also build lexical analysers via the longest-match method. Ragel specifically targets text parsing and input validation. Ragel's repository has been archived on Mar 6, 2026, and Ragel has become part of colm-suite.

== Overview ==
Ragel supports the generation of table or control flow driven state machines from regular expressions and/or state charts and can also build lexical analysers via the longest-match method. A unique feature of Ragel is that user actions can be associated with arbitrary state machine transitions using operators that are integrated into the regular expressions. Ragel also supports visualization of the generated machine via graphviz.

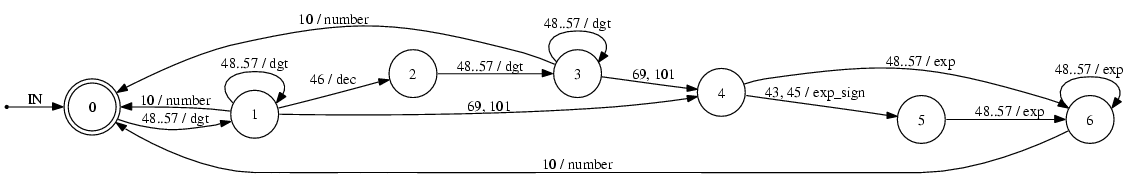

The above graph represents a state-machine that takes user input as a series of bytes representing ASCII characters and control codes. 48..57 is equivalent to the regular expression [0-9] (i.e. any digit), so only sequences beginning with a digit can be recognised. If 10 (line feed) is encountered, the program is done. 46 is the decimal point ('.'), 43 and 45 are positive and negative signs ('+', '-') and 69/101 is uppercase/lowercase 'e' (to indicate a number in scientific format). As such, it will recognize the following properly:

2
45
055
78.1
2e5
78.3e12
69.0e-3
3e+3

but not:

.3
46.
-5
3.e2
2e5.1

== Syntax ==
Ragel's input is a regular expression only in the sense that it describes a regular language; it is usually not written in a concise regular expression, but written out into multiple parts like in Extended Backus–Naur form. For example, instead of supporting POSIX character classes in regex syntax, Ragel implements them as built-in production rules. As with usual parser generators, Ragel allows for handling code for productions to be written with the syntax. The code yielding the above example from the official website is:

action dgt      { printf("DGT: %c\n", fc); }
action dec      { printf("DEC: .\n"); }
action exp      { printf("EXP: %c\n", fc); }
action exp_sign { printf("SGN: %c\n", fc); }
action number   { /*NUMBER*/ }

# A floating-point number literal.
number = (
    [0-9]+ $dgt ( '.' @dec [0-9]+ $dgt )?
    ( [eE] ( [+\-] $exp_sign )? [0-9]+ $exp )?
) %number;

main := ( number '\n' )*;

== See also ==
- Comparison of parser generators
- Executable UML
- Finite-state machine
- Regular expression
- Thompson's construction - the algorithm used by Ragel
- Umple
- Lex
- re2c
- Helsinki Finite-State Technology (HFST)
- Cloudbleed
