= Parboiled (Java) =

Open-source Java library

parboiled Library
- Developer(s): Mathias Doenitz
- Initial release: November 12, 2009; 15 years ago
- Stable release: 1.4.1 / March 11, 2022; 3 years ago
- Repository: github.com/sirthias/parboiled
- Written in: Java
- Operating system: Cross-platform
- License: Apache License 2.0
- Website: parboiled.org

parboiled is an open-source Java library released under an Apache License. It provides support for defining PEG parsers directly in Java source code.

parboiled is commonly used as an alternative for regular expressions or parser generators (like ANTLR or JavaCC), especially for smaller and medium-size applications.

Apart from providing the constructs for grammar definition parboiled implements a complete recursive descent parser with support for abstract syntax tree construction, parse error reporting and parse error recovery.
