= Natural semantic metalanguage =

Linguistic theory of semantic description

Natural Semantic Metalanguage (NSM) is a linguistic theory that reduces lexicons down to a set of semantic primitives. It is based on the conception of Polish professor Andrzej Bogusławski. The theory was formally developed by Anna Wierzbicka at Warsaw University and later at the Australian National University in the early 1970s, and Cliff Goddard at Australia's Griffith University.

== Approach ==
The Natural Semantic Metalanguage (NSM) theory attempts to reduce the semantics of all lexicons down to a restricted set of semantic primitives, or primes. Primes are universal in that they have the same translation in every language, and they are primitive in that they cannot be defined using other words. Primes are ordered together to form explications, which are descriptions of semantic representations consisting solely of primes.

Research in the NSM approach deals extensively with language and cognition, and language and culture. Key areas of research include lexical semantics, grammatical semantics, phraseology and pragmatics, as well as cross-cultural communication.

Dozens of languages, including representatives of 16 language groups, have been studied using the NSM framework. They include English, Russian, Polish, French, Spanish, Italian, Swedish, Danish, Finnish, Malay, Japanese, Chinese, Korean, Ewe, Wolof, East Cree, Koromu, at least 16 Australian languages, and a number of creole languages including Trinidadian creole, Roper River Kriol, Bislama and Tok Pisin.

Apart from the originators Anna Wierzbicka and Cliff Goddard, a number of other scholars have participated in NSM semantics, most notably Bert Peeters, Zhengdao Ye, Felix Ameka, Jean Harkins, Marie-Odile Junker, Anna Gladkova, Jock Wong, Carsten Levisen, Helen Bromhead, Karen Stollznow, Adrian Tien, Carol Priestley, Yuko Asano-Cavanagh and Gian Marco Farese.

== Semantic primes ==
Semantic primes (also known as semantic primitives) are concepts that are universal, meaning that they can be translated literally into any known language and retain their semantic representation, and primitive, as they are proposed to be the most simple linguistic concepts and are unable to be defined using simpler terms.

Proponents of the NSM theory argue that every language shares a core vocabulary of concepts. In 1994 and 2002, Goddard and Wierzbicka studied languages across the globe and found strong evidence supporting this argument.

Wierzbicka's 1972 study proposed 14 semantic primes. That number was expanded to 60 in 2002 by Wierzbicka and Goddard, and the current agreed-upon number is 65.

Each language's translations of the semantic primes are called exponents. Below is a list of English exponents, or the English translation of the semantic primes. Some of the exponents in the following list are polysemous and can be associated with meanings in English (and other languages) that are not shared. However, when used as an exponent in the Natural Semantic Metalanguage, it is only the prime concept which is identified as universal.

The following is a list of English exponents of semantic primes adapted from Levisen and Waters (eds.) 2017.

Category	Primes
Substantives	I, you, someone, people, something/thing, body
Relational Substantives	kind, part
Determiners	this, the same, other~else~another
Quantifiers	one, two, some, all, much/many, little/few
Evaluators	good, bad
Descriptors	big, small
Mental predicates	think, know, want, don't want, feel, see, hear
Speech	say, words, true
Actions, Events, Movement	do, happen, move
Existence, Possession	be (somewhere), there is, be (someone/something), (is) mine
Life and Death	live, die
Time	when/time, now, before, after, a long time, a short time, for some time, moment
Space	where/place, here, above, below, far, near, side, inside, touch (contact)
Logical concepts	not, maybe, can, because, if
Intensifier, Augmentor	very, more
Similarity	like/as/way

=== NSM syntax ===
NSM primes can be combined in a limited set of syntactic frames that are also universal. These valency options stipulate the specific types of grammatical functions that can be combined with the primes. While these combinations can be realized differently in other languages, it is believed that the meanings expressed by these syntactic combinations are universal.

Examples of valency frames for the "say" semantic prime:

- someone said something→[minimal frame]
- someone said: '––'→[direct speech]
- someone said something to someone→[plus 'addressee']
- someone said something about something/someone→[plus 'locutionary topic']

=== Explications ===
A semantic analysis in the NSM approach results in a reductive paraphrase called an explication that captures the meaning of the concept explicated. An ideal explication can be substituted for the original expression in context without change of meaning.

For example: Someone X broke something Y:

someone X did something to something Y
because of this, something happened to Y at the same time
it happened in one moment
because of this, after this Y was not one thing anymore
people can think about it like this: "it can't be one thing anymore"

== Semantic molecules ==
Semantic molecules are intermediary words used in explications and cultural scripts. While not semantic primes, they can be defined exclusively using primes. Semantic molecules can be determined as words that are necessary to build upon to explicate other words. These molecules are marked by the notation [m] in explications and cultural scripts. Some molecules are proposed to be universal or near-universal, while others are culture- or area-specific.

Examples of proposed universal molecules:

Body parts	hands, mouth, eyes, head, ears, nose, face, teeth, fingers, breast, skin, bones, blood
Physical	long, round, flat, thin, hard, soft, sharp, smooth, heavy
Biosocial	children, men, women, be born, mother, father, wife, husband

== Applications ==
=== Minimal English ===
Minimal English is a derivative of the Natural Semantic Metalanguage research, with the first major publication in 2018. It is a reduced form of English designed for non-specialists to use when requiring clarity of expression or easily translatable materials. Minimal English uses an expanded set of vocabulary to the semantic primes. It includes the proposed universal and near-universal molecules, as well as non-universal words which can assist in clarity. As such, it already has counterparts targeted at speakers of other natural languages, e.g. Minimal French, Minimal Polish, 65 Sanaa (Minimal Finnish) and so on. Minimal English differs from other simple Englishes (such as Basic English) as it has been specifically designed for maximal cross-translatability.

=== Language engineering ===
Applications of NSM have also been proposed for natural-language processing, natural-language understanding and artificial intelligence.

=== Revivalistics ===
Ghil'ad Zuckermann suggests that NSM can be of benefit in revivalistics (language revitalization) as it "can neutralize the Western semantic bias involved in reconnecting with ancient Aboriginal traditions using English, and may allow a fuller understanding of the original meaning of the Aboriginal lexical items."

== See also ==
- Metalanguage – Language used to describe another language
- Semantic decomposition – Involves breaking down the meanings of phrases or concepts into less complex concepts
- Upper ontology – Ontology applicable across domains of knowledge

== Sources ==
- Goddard, Cliff. 1998. Semantic Analysis: A practical introduction. Oxford. Oxford University Press.
- Goddard, Cliff (ed.) 2006. Ethnopragmatics – Understanding discourse in cultural context. Berlin: Mouton de Gruyter.
- Goddard, Cliff (ed.) 2008. Cross-Linguistic Semantics. Amsterdam/Philadelphia: John Benjamins.
- Goddard, Cliff and Wierzbicka, Anna (eds.). 1994. Semantic and Lexical Universals – Theory and Empirical Findings. Amsterdam/Philadelphia: John Benjamins.
- Goddard, Cliff and Wierzbicka, Anna (eds.). 2002. Meaning and Universal Grammar: Theory and Empirical Findings (2 volumes). Amsterdam/Philadelphia: John Benjamins.
- Harkins, Jean & Anna Wierzbicka. 2001. Emotions in Crosslinguistic Perspective. Berlin: Mouton de Gruyter.
- Peeters, Bert (ed.) 2006. Semantic Primes and Universal Grammar: Empirical evidence from the Romance languages. Amsterdam: John Benjamins.
- Wierzbicka, Anna. 1972. Semantic Primitives. Frankfurt: Athenäum.
- Wierzbicka, Anna. 1992. Semantics, Culture, and Cognition. Oxford: Oxford University Press.
- Wierzbicka, Anna. 1996. Semantics: Primes and Universals. Oxford: Oxford University Press.
- Wierzbicka, Anna. 1997. Understanding Cultures Through Their Key Words. Oxford: Oxford University Press.
- Wierzbicka, Anna. 1999. Emotions Across Languages and Cultures. Cambridge: Cambridge University Press.
- Wierzbicka, Anna. 2003 (1991). Cross-cultural Pragmatics: The semantics of human interaction. 2nd edition. Berlin: Mouton de Gruyter.
- Wierzbicka, Anna. 2006. English: Meaning and culture. New York: Oxford University Press.
