= Zhengdao Ye =

Zhengdao Ye (叶正道) is an Australia-based Chinese linguist who specializes in semantics, pragmatics, translation studies and intercultural communication. She is a lecturer at the Australian National University. She has contributed to the development of NSM semantics in Mandarin and Shanghainese, to the study of the semantics of nouns, and the semantics of emotion.
