= Abstract semantic graph =

Abstract syntax representing expressions as graphs

In computer science, an abstract semantic graph (ASG) or term graph is a form of abstract syntax in which an expression of a formal or programming language is represented by a graph whose vertices are the expression's subterms. An ASG is at a higher level of abstraction than an abstract syntax tree (or AST), which is used to express the syntactic structure of an expression or program.

ASGs are more complex and concise than ASTs because they may contain shared subterms (also known as "common subexpressions"). Abstract semantic graphs are often used as an intermediate representation by compilers to store the results of performing common subexpression elimination upon abstract syntax trees. ASTs are trees and are thus incapable of representing shared terms. ASGs are usually directed acyclic graphs (DAG), although in some applications graphs containing cycles may be permitted. For example, a graph containing a cycle might be used to represent the recursive expressions that are commonly used in functional programming languages as non-looping iteration constructs. The mutability of these types of graphs, is studied in the field of graph rewriting.

The nomenclature term graph is associated with the field of term graph rewriting, which involves the transformation and processing of expressions by the specification of rewriting rules, whereas abstract semantic graph is used when discussing linguistics, programming languages, type systems and compilation.

Abstract syntax trees are not capable of sharing subexpression nodes because it is not possible for a node in a proper tree to have more than one parent. Although this conceptual simplicity is appealing, it may come at the cost of redundant representation and, in turn, possibly inefficiently duplicating the computation of identical terms. For this reason ASGs are often used as an intermediate language at a subsequent compilation stage to abstract syntax tree construction via parsing.

An abstract semantic graph is typically constructed from an abstract syntax tree by a process of enrichment and abstraction. The enrichment can for example be the addition of back-pointers, edges from an identifier node (where a variable is being used) to a node representing the declaration of that variable. The abstraction can entail the removal of details which are relevant only in parsing, not for semantics.

== Example: Code Refactoring ==
For example, consider the case of code refactoring. To represent the implementation of a function that takes an input argument, the received parameter is conventionally given an arbitrary, distinct name in the source code so that it can be referenced. The abstract representation of this conceptual entity, a "function argument" instance, will likely be mentioned in the function signature, and also one or more times within the implementation code body. Since the function as a whole is the parent of both its header or "signature" information as well as its implementation body, an AST would not be able to use the same node to co-identify the multiple uses or appearances of the argument entity. This is solved by the DAG nature of an ASG. A key advantage of having a single, distinct node identity for any given code element is that each element's properties are, by definition, uniquely stored. This simplifies refactoring operations, because there is exactly one existential nexus for any given property instantiation. If the developer decides to change a property value such as the "name" of any code element (the "function argument" in this example), the ASG inherently exposes that value in exactly one place, and it follows that any such property changes are implicitly, trivially, and immediately propagated globally.

== See also ==
- Ontology (computer science)
- Semantic Web
- Semantic Grid
