= Metalanguage =

Language used to describe another language

In logic and linguistics, a metalanguage is a language used to describe another language, often called the object language. Expressions in a metalanguage are often distinguished from those in the object language by the use of italics, quotation marks, or writing on a separate line. For example, to say that the word "noun" can be used as a noun in a sentence, one could write "noun" is a <noun>.

A metasyntax is the syntax of a metalanguage which defines the formal grammar of a formal language.

== Types of metalanguage ==
There are a variety of recognized types of metalanguage, including embedded, ordered, and nested (or hierarchical) metalanguages.

=== Embedded ===
An embedded metalanguage is a language formally, naturally and firmly fixed in an object language. This idea is found in Douglas Hofstadter's book, Gödel, Escher, Bach, in a discussion of the relationship between formal languages and number theory: "... it is in the nature of any formalization of number theory that its metalanguage is embedded within it."

It occurs in natural, or informal, languages, as well—such as in English, where words such as noun, verb, or even word describe features and concepts pertaining to the English language itself.

=== Ordered ===
An ordered metalanguage is analogous to an ordered logic. An example of an ordered metalanguage is the construction of one metalanguage to discuss an object language, followed by the creation of another metalanguage to discuss the first, etc.

=== Nested ===
A nested (or hierarchical) metalanguage is similar to an ordered metalanguage in that each level represents a greater degree of abstraction. However, a nested metalanguage differs from an ordered one in that each level includes the one below.

The paradigmatic example of a nested metalanguage comes from the Linnean taxonomic system in biology. Each level in the system incorporates the one below it. The language used to discuss genus is also used to discuss species; the one used to discuss orders is also used to discuss genera, etc., up to kingdoms.

== In natural language ==
Natural language combines nested and ordered metalanguages. In a natural language there is an infinite regress of metalanguages, each with more specialized vocabulary and simpler syntax.

Designating the language now as $L_0$, the grammar of the language is a discourse in the metalanguage $L_1$, which is a sublanguage nested within $L_0$.

- The grammar of $L_1$, which has the form of a factual description, is a discourse in the meta–metalanguage $L_2$, which is also a sublanguage of $L_0$.
- The grammar of $L_2$, which has the form of a theory describing the syntactic structure of such factual descriptions, is stated in the meta–meta–metalanguage $L_3$, which likewise is a sublanguage of $L_0$.
- The grammar of $L_3$ has the form of a metatheory describing the syntactic structure of theories stated in $L_2$.
- $L_4$ and succeeding metalanguages have the same grammar as $L_3$, differing only in reference.

Since all of these metalanguages are sublanguages of $L_0$, $L_1$ is a nested metalanguage, but $L_2$ and sequel are ordered metalanguages. Since all these metalanguages are sublanguages of $L_0$ they are all embedded languages with respect to the language as a whole.

Metalanguages of formal systems all resolve ultimately to natural language, the 'common parlance' in which mathematicians and logicians converse to define their terms and operations and 'read out' their formulae.

=== Natural semantic metalanguage ===
Natural semantic metalanguage (NSM) is a linguistic theory that reduces lexicons down to a set of semantic primitives. It is based on the conception of Polish professor Andrzej Bogusławski. The theory was formally developed by Anna Wierzbicka at Warsaw University and later at the Australian National University in the early 1970s, and Cliff Goddard at Australia's Griffith University.

== Types of expressions ==
There are several entities commonly expressed in a metalanguage. In logic usually the object language that the metalanguage is discussing is a formal language, and very often the metalanguage as well.

=== Deductive systems ===
A deductive system (or, deductive apparatus of a formal system) consists of the axioms (or axiom schemata) and rules of inference that can be used to derive the theorems of the system.

=== Metavariables ===
A metavariable (or metalinguistic or metasyntactic variable) is a symbol or set of symbols in a metalanguage which stands for a symbol or set of symbols in some object language. For instance, in the sentence:

Let A and B be arbitrary formulas of a formal language $L$.

The symbols A and B are not symbols of the object language $L$, they are metavariables in the metalanguage (in this case, English) that is discussing the object language $L$.

=== Metatheories and metatheorems ===
A metatheory is a theory whose subject matter is some other theory (a theory about a theory). Statements made in the metatheory about the theory are called metatheorems. A metatheorem is a true statement about a formal system expressed in a metalanguage. Unlike theorems proved within a given formal system, a metatheorem is proved within a metatheory, and may reference concepts that are present in the metatheory but not the object theory.

=== Interpretations ===
An interpretation is an assignment of meanings to the symbols and words of a language.

== Metalinguistic awareness ==
Metalinguistic awareness, also known as metalinguistic ability, refers to the ability to consciously reflect on the nature of language and to use metalanguage to describe it. The concept of metalinguistic awareness is helpful in explaining the execution and transfer of linguistic knowledge across languages (e.g. code-switching as well as translation among bilinguals). Metalinguistics expresses itself in ways such as:

- an awareness that language has the potential to go beyond the literal meaning, to further include multiple or implied meanings, formal structures like phonemes, syntax, etc.
- an awareness, therefore, of the flexibility of language through irony, sarcasm and other forms of word play
- an awareness, therefore, too, that language has a structure that can be manipulated
- an awareness that a word is separable from its referent (meaning resides in the mind, not in the name, i.e. Sonia is Sonia, and I will be the same person even if somebody calls me another name)

Metalinguistic awareness is therefore distinct from the notion of engaging with normal language operations, but instead with the process of language use and the exercise of the relevant control.

Currently, the most commonly held conception of metalinguistic awareness suggests that its development is constituted by cognitive control (i.e. selecting and coordinating the relevant pieces of information needed to comprehend the language manipulation) and analysed knowledge (i.e. recognising the meaning and structure of the manipulated language).

== Role in metaphor ==
Michael J. Reddy (1979) argues that much of the language we use to talk about language is conceptualized and structured by what he refers to as the conduit metaphor. This paradigm operates through two distinct, related frameworks.

The major framework views language as a sealed pipeline between people:

Major framework
Stage	Description	Example
1	Language transfers people's thoughts and feelings (mental content) to others	Try to get your thoughts across better
2	Speakers and writers insert their mental content into words	You have to put each concept into words more carefully
3	Words are containers	That sentence was filled with emotion
4	Listeners and readers extract mental content from words	Let me know if you find any new sensations in the poem

The minor framework views language as an open pipe spilling mental content into the void:

Minor framework
Stage	Description	Example
1	Speakers and writers eject mental content into an external space	Get those ideas out where they can do some good
2	Mental content is reified (viewed as concrete) in this space	That concept has been floating around for decades
3	Listeners and readers extract mental content from this space	Let me know if you find any good concepts in the essay

== Metaprogramming ==
Computers follow programs, sets of instructions in formal languages. The development of a programming language involves the use of a metalanguage. The act of working with metalanguages in programming is known as metaprogramming.

Backus–Naur form, developed in the 1960s by John Backus and Peter Naur, is one of the earliest metalanguages used in computing. Examples of modern-day programming languages which commonly find use in metaprogramming include ML, Lisp, m4, and Yacc.

=== Metalinguistic abstraction ===
In computer science, metalinguistic abstraction is the process of solving complex problems by creating a new language or vocabulary to better understand the problem space. More generally, it also encompasses the ability or skill of a programmer to think outside of the pre-conceived notions of a specific language in order to exploratorily investigate a problem space in search of the kind of solutions which are most natural or cognitively ergonomic to it. It is a recurring theme in the seminal MIT textbook Structure and Interpretation of Computer Programs, which uses Scheme, a dialect of Lisp, as a framework for constructing new languages.

== See also ==
- Category theory – General theory of mathematical structures
- Formal language – Sequence of words formed by specific rules
- Jakobson's functions of language – Theory of language
- Language-oriented programming – Programming paradigm
- Meta-communication – Communication about how information is meant to be interpreted
- Metaethics – Branch of ethics
- Metafiction – Genre of fiction about fiction
- Metagraphy – Experimental form of visual communication
- Metamathematics – Study of mathematics itself
- Metalocutionary act – Concept in linguistic pragmatics
- Metaphilosophy – Investigation of the nature of philosophy
- Nested quotation – Quotations within quotations
- Paralanguage – Communication of additional meaning, nuance, or emotion in speech
- Self-reference – Sentence, idea or formula that refers to itself
- Use–mention distinction – Distinction between using a word and mentioning it

== Dictionaries ==
- Audi, R. 1996. The Cambridge Dictionary of Philosophy. Cambridge: Cambridge University Press.
- Baldick, C. 1996. Oxford Concise Dictionary of Literary Terms. Oxford: Oxford University Press.
- Cuddon, J. A. 1999. The Penguin Dictionary of Literary Terms and Literary Theory. London: Penguin Books.
- Honderich, T. 1995. The Oxford Companion to Philosophy. Oxford: Oxford University Press.
- Matthews, P. H. 1997. The Concise Oxford Dictionary of Linguistics. Oxford: Oxford University Press. ISBN 978-0-19-280008-4.
- McArthur, T. 1996. The Concise Oxford Companion to the English Language. Oxford: Oxford University Press.
