= SableCC =

- Stable release: 3.7
- Preview release: 4-beta.4
- Written in: Java
- Platform: Java Virtual Machine
- Type: Parser/scanner generator
- License: GNU Lesser General Public License
- Website: http://www.sablecc.org/

SableCC is an open-source compiler generator (or interpreter generator) in Java. Stable version is licensed under the GNU Lesser General Public License (LGPL). Rewritten version 4 is licensed under Apache License 2.0.

SableCC includes the following features:

- Deterministic finite automaton (DFA)-based lexers with full Unicode support and lexical states.
- Extended Backus–Naur form grammar syntax. (Supports the *, ? and + operators).
- LALR(1) based parsers.
- Automatic generation of strictly-typed abstract syntax trees.
- Automatic generation of tree-walker classes.

== See also ==
- ANTLR
- JavaCC
- Coco/R
