= Semantic decomposition (natural language processing) =

Deconstruction of words into their meaning

A semantic decomposition is an algorithm that breaks down the meanings of phrases or concepts into less complex concepts. The result of a semantic decomposition is a representation of meaning. This representation can be used for tasks, such as those related to artificial intelligence or machine learning. Semantic decomposition is common in natural language processing applications.

The basic idea of a semantic decomposition is taken from the learning skills of adult humans, where words are explained using other words. It is based on Meaning-text theory. Meaning-text theory is used as a theoretical linguistic framework to describe the meaning of concepts with other concepts.

== Background ==
Given that an AI does not inherently have language, it is unable to think about the meanings behind the words of a language. An artificial notion of meaning needs to be created for a strong AI to emerge.

Creating an artificial representation of meaning requires the analysis of what meaning is. Many terms are associated with meaning, including semantics, pragmatics, knowledge and understanding or word sense. Each term describes a particular aspect of meaning, and contributes to a multitude of theories explaining what meaning is. These theories need to be analyzed further to develop an artificial notion of meaning best fit for our current state of knowledge.

== Graph representations ==
Abstract approach on how knowledge representation and reasoning allow a problem specific solution (answer) to a given problem (questions)

Representing meaning as a graph is one of the two ways that both an AI cognition and a linguistic researcher think about meaning (connectionist view). Logicians utilize a formal representation of meaning to build upon the idea of symbolic representation, whereas description logics describe languages and the meaning of symbols. This contention between 'neat' and 'scruffy' techniques has been discussed since the 1970s.

Research has so far identified semantic measures and with that word-sense disambiguation (WSD) - the differentiation of meaning of words - as the main problem of language understanding. As an AI-complete environment, WSD is a core problem of natural language understanding. AI approaches that use knowledge-given reasoning creates a notion of meaning combining the state of the art knowledge of natural meaning with the symbolic and connectionist formalization of meaning for AI. The abstract approach is shown in Figure. First, a connectionist knowledge representation is created as a semantic network consisting of concepts and their relations to serve as the basis for the representation of meaning.

This graph is built out of different knowledge sources like WordNet, Wiktionary, and BabelNET. The graph is created by lexical decomposition that recursively breaks each concept semantically down into a set of semantic primes. The primes are taken from the theory of Natural Semantic Metalanguage, which has been analyzed for usefulness in formal languages. Upon this graph marker passing is used to create the dynamic part of meaning representing thoughts. The marker passing algorithm, where symbolic information is passed along relations form one concept to another, uses node and edge interpretation to guide its markers. The node and edge interpretation model is the symbolic influence of certain concepts.

Future work uses the created representation of meaning to build heuristics and evaluate them through capability matching and agent planning, chatbots or other applications of natural language understanding.

== See also ==
- Latent Semantic Analysis
- Lexical semantics
- Principle of compositionality
