= Terence Parr =

American computer scientist (born 1964)

Terence John Parr
- Born: 1964 (age 61–62); Los Angeles, CA
- Education: Purdue University (B.Sc., M.Eng., PhD)
- Scientific career
- Fields: computer languages, computer engineering
- Workplaces: University of San Francisco

Terence John Parr (born 1964 in Los Angeles) is a professor of computer science at the University of San Francisco. He is best known for his ANTLR parser generator and contributions to parsing theory. He also developed the StringTemplate engine for Java and other programming languages.

== Education ==
Parr holds a Bachelor's degree in Computer Science, a Master's degree in Engineering, and a PhD in Computer Engineering from Purdue University. He was a postdoctoral fellow in the Army High-Performance Computing Research Center (also known as AHPCRC), located in the University of Minnesota.

== Books ==
- Parr, Terence (May 17, 2007), The Definitive ANTLR Reference: Building Domain-Specific Languages (1st ed.), Pragmatic Bookshelf, p. 376, ISBN 978-0-9787392-5-6, archived from the original on 2021-11-18
- Parr, Terence (December 2009), Language Implementation Patterns: Create Your Own Domain-Specific and General Programming Languages (1st ed.), Pragmatic Bookshelf, p. 374, ISBN 978-1-934356-45-6, archived from the original on 2021-10-29
- Parr, Terence (2010), Language Implementation Patterns (1st ed.), p. 389, ISBN 978-1-93435645-6
- Parr, Terence (March 7, 2013), The Definitive ANTLR 4 Reference: Building Domain-Specific Languages (1st ed.), Pragmatic Bookshelf, p. 325, ISBN 978-1934356999, archived from the original on April 18, 2015
