= Metalocutionary act =

Concept in linguistic pragmatics

In linguistic pragmatics, the term metalocutionary act is sometimes used for a speech act that refers to the forms and functions of the discourse itself rather than continuing the substantive development of the discourse.

The term metalocutionary act originated as metalocution (Gibbon 1976, 1983) in functional descriptions of intonation in English and German, by analogy with locution (locutionary act), illocution (illocutionary act) and perlocution (perlocutionary act) in speech act theory. The term metalocutionary act has developed a more general meaning and may include, for example, quotation acts and comments on preceding speech acts.

== Definition ==
Metalocutionary deixis is the denotation (in the strict semantic sense) of utterance constituents at points and over intervals in the temporal structure of utterances by means of prosodic deictic indices such as pitch accents, intonation contours and boundary tones.

In the prosodic literature, "mark" is often used informally instead of the strict "denote". The metalocutionary functions are structural rather than attitudinal or emotional functions of prosody. A precursor of the concept of metalocutionary function is found in the configurational function of intonation proposed by the Prague School of linguistics (e.g. Trubetzkoy 1939), with the more specific culmination function and delimitation function, as in accentuation on the one hand and domain or boundary marking on the other.

== Examples ==
Example 1: In orthography, e.g. Are Henry and Catherine REALly going?, capitalisation (or other highlighting) of the syllable real and punctuation (including the initial capital a and the interrogation point) are orthographic metalocutions: capitalisation denotes the syllable real and the word really, of which the syllable is a constituent, while the punctuation denotes the domain of the question function.

Example 2: In the pronunciation of Are Henry and Catherine REALly going? (where the syllable real may receive a pitch accent, and the interrogation point may be rendered with a rising final tone and a globally rising pitch contour), the pitch accent is a prosodic metalocution which denotes the syllable real and the word really, and the final rising pitch is a prosodic metalocution which denotes the end portion of the utterance (as well as a non-final or question speech act); the global rising pitch is a prosodic metalocution which denotes an intonation domain.
