= Anna Wierzbicka =

Polish linguist (born 1938)

- Born: 10 March 1938 (age 88); Warsaw, Poland
- Awards: Prize of the Foundation for Polish Science (2010); Dobrushin Award (2010)

Academic background
- Education: Warsaw University

Academic work
- Main interests: Semantics, pragmatics and cross-cultural linguistics
- Notable ideas: Natural semantic metalanguage

Anna Wierzbicka (Polish: [ˈanna vʲɛʐˈbʲitska]; born 10 March 1938) is a Polish linguist who is emeritus Professor at the Australian National University, Canberra. Brought up in Poland, she graduated from Warsaw University and emigrated to Australia in 1972, where she has lived since. With over twenty published books, many of which have been translated into other languages, she is a prolific writer.

Wierzbicka is known for her work in semantics, pragmatics and cross-cultural linguistics, especially for the natural semantic metalanguage and the concept of semantic primes. Her research agenda resembles Gottfried Wilhelm Leibniz's original "alphabet of human thought". Wierzbicka credits her colleague, linguist Andrzej Bogusławski, with reviving it in the late 1960s.

== Biography ==
External videos
- In Conversation with Anna Wierzbicka — Living in Languages

Wierzbicka was born in 1938, just before the outbreak of World War II. She received her PhD from the Institute of Literary Research at the Polish Academy of Sciences in 1964 and her habilitation degree five years later. Since 1973 she has been working at ANU, from 1989 as a professor. 1988 saw her elected fellow of the Australian Academy of the Humanities. In 1996 she was elected a Fellow of the Academy of the Social Sciences in Australia. Throughout her career she has collaborated closely with Polish researchers, and was awarded the Prize of the Foundation for Polish Science for developing the theory of the natural semantic metalanguage and discovering a set of elementary meanings common to all languages. Her work spans a number of disciplines, including anthropology, psychology, cognitive science, philosophy, and religious studies as well as linguistics.

== Natural semantic metalanguage ==
In her 1972 book Semantic Primitives, she launched a theory of natural semantic metalanguage, a theory of language and meaning that is intended to be language neutral. Over the next 35 years, Wierzbicka refined the concept and developed an inventory of about 200 basic meanings that are established/checked with a sequence of five statements. She claims these meanings to be the nucleus of human language as such.

== Awards ==
- Honorary degree from Maria Curie-Skłodowska University (2004)
- Honorary degree from Warsaw University (2006)
- Prize of the Foundation for Polish Science (2010)
- Dobrushin Award (2010)

== Bibliography ==
=== Books ===
- (co-authored with Cliff Goddard) Words and Meanings: Lexical Semantics Across Domains, Languages, and Cultures. Oxford UP (2014). ISBN 9780199668434
- Imprisoned in English. The Hazards of English As a Default Language, Oxford UP 2013. ISBN 978-0-19-932150-6
- Experience, Evidence, and Sense: The Hidden Cultural Legacy of English (2010). ISBN 0-19-536801-0
- English: Meaning and culture (2006). ISBN 0-19-517474-7
- What Did Jesus Mean? Explaining the Sermon on the Mount and the Parables in simple and universal human concepts (2001).
- Emotions Across Languages and Cultures: Diversity and universals (1999).
- Understanding Cultures Through Their Key Words: English, Russian, Polish, German, Japanese (1997).
- Semantics: Primes and Universals (1996).
- Semantics, Culture and Cognition: Universal human concepts in culture-specific configurations (1992).
- Cross-cultural pragmatics: The semantics of human interaction (1991).
- The Semantics of Grammar (1988).
- English Speech Act Verbs: A semantic dictionary (1987).
- Lexicography and Conceptual Analysis (1985).
- The Case for Surface Case (1980).
- Lingua Mentalis: The semantics of natural language (1980).
- Semantic Primitives (1972).

=== Articles ===
Anna Wierzbicka has published over 300 articles in journals from the disciplines her work spans, including Language, Current Anthropology, American Anthropologist, Man, Anthropological Linguistics, Cognition and Emotion, Culture and Psychology, Ethos, Philosophica, Behavioral and Brain Sciences and The Journal of Cognition and Culture.

== See also ==
- Cliff Goddard
- Polish Linguists
