= Andrzej Bogusławski =

Polish linguistics theorist (1931–2026)

Andrzej Stanisław Bogusławski
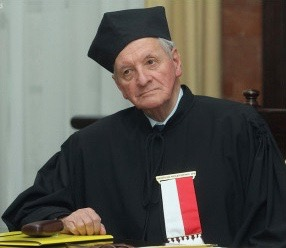
- Bogusławski in 2012
- Born: 1 December 1931; Warsaw, Poland
- Died: 6 January 2026 (aged 94)
- Scientific career
- Fields: Epistemology of language Grammar; Lexicography; Linguistics; Russian language Semantics; Semiotics; Theory of language
- Workplaces: University of Warsaw; Polish Academy of Learning; Polish Academy of Sciences; Warsaw Scientific Society, University of Oldenburg

Andrzej Stanisław Bogusławski (1 December 1931 – 6 January 2026) was a Polish philologist, semanticist, semioticist and philosopher of language of international repute. Originally a specialist in Russian language, his interests broadened into the epistemology of language and linguistics.

During martial law in Poland he was interned for refusing to sign an oath of loyalty which led to international protests. He was a professor emeritus at Warsaw University.

== Career ==
His early work focused on Russian language and moved later to the theory of language. He became a member of the Polish Academy of Sciences philology committee, a member of the Warsaw Scientific Society, a national member of the Polish Academy of Learning, and for many years director of the faculty of Formal Linguistics at Warsaw University.

=== Political internment ===
On 13 December 1981, he was arrested and interned by the Polish authorities for refusing to sign an oath of loyalty. Noam Chomsky, among other academics, called for his release. He was released on 16 July 1982.

== Research ==
Bogusławski's research interests ranged from lexicography, through grammar, semantics, semiotics to formal logic and the roots of language in philosophy and theology. He collaborated with Anna Wierzbicka on Natural semantic metalanguage research and is credited by her with reviving the notion of Leibniz's "alphabet of human thought", or Lingua Mentalis. Bogusławski is an acknowledged authority in the field of the theory of language and research methodology in the sphere of Indo-European languages, especially Slavic languages. His interests also take in semantics, lexicology, lexicography, pragmatics, syntax, inflection, neologism phonology, theories of text and translation, semiotics and the theory of literature.

He made original contributions to the methodology of semantics and to the theoretical bases of synchronistic morphology, lexicology, lexicography. In the 1960s he hypothesised the emergence of natural language generation with the aid of elementary linguistic units. In the 1970s he postulated a theory of operational grammar, relating linguistic elements to syntax. This helped to advance understanding of how the fields of internal languages are demarcated and he assisted the development of the empirical study of linguistics. He laid down the methodological basis of contemporary synchronous lexicography. He has also explored the frontiers of language and philosophy.

== Death ==
Bogusławski died on 6 January 2026, at the age of 94.

== Honours ==
- In 2001 he was honoured with a Festschrift on the occasion of his 70th birthday.
- In 2003 he was awarded the Commander's Cross with Star of the Order of Polonia Restituta.
- On 16 May 2012 Andrzej Bogusławski was awarded an Honorary doctorate by the University of Torun.

== Works ==
Bogusławski was the author of over 400 publications and the editor of the Polish-Russian and Russian-Polish dictionary. He published in Polish, Russian and English.

=== Selected books ===
- Bogusławski, Andrzej (2023). Metodologia lingwistyki. Zarys. Warsaw: Wydawnictwa Uniwersytetu Warszawskiego. ISBN 978-83-235-8353-0.
- Bogusławski, Andrzej (2010). Dwa studia z teorii fleksji (i inne przyczynki). Warsaw: Bel Studio. ISBN 978-83-61208-46-4.
- Bogusławski, Andrzej (2007). A study in the linguistics-philosophy interface. Warsaw: BEL Studio. ISBN 978-83-89968-80-7. .
- Fleksja rosyjska, Warsaw 2005.
- Aspekt i negacja, Warsaw 2003^{1}, 2004^{2}.
- Science as Linguistic Activity, Linguistics as Scientific Activity, Warszawa 1998.
- Sprawy słowa = Word matters, Warsaw 1994.
- Two Essays on Inflection, Warsaw 1992.
- Język w słowniku : desiderata semantyczne do wielkiego słownika polszczyzny, Wrocław 1988.
- Ilustrowany słownik rosyjsko-polski, polsko-rosyjski, t. 1–2, Warsaw 1978^{1}, 1983^{2}, 1986^{3}, 1993^{4}.
- Problems of the Thematic-Rhematic Structure of Sentences, Warsaw 1977.
- Semantyczne pojęcie liczebnika i jego morfologia w języku rosyjskim, Wrocław 1966.

=== Selected articles ===
- Rezygnacja i nadzieja filozofów, „Przegląd Humanistyczny” 2004 Nr 383, p. 1–26.
- A note on Apresjan`s concept of "Polish school of semantics" with an appendix, „Lingua Posnaniensis” 2003 Tom XLV, p. 7–18.
- Jeszcze o wiedzy i wszechwiedzy, „Przegląd Humanistyczny” 2002 Tom 3, p. 67–73.
- Reflections on Wierzbicka`s explications, „Lingua Posnaniensis” 2001 Tom XLIII, p. 47–88.
- On the necessity of necessity, „Lingua Posnaniensis” 2001 Tom XLIII, p. 39–45.
- O pozytywnej stronie granic poznania, in U progu trzeciego tysiąclecia. Człowiek - Nauka - Wiara, Warsaw 2000, pp. 209–245.
- Człowiek współczesny: rozum i wiara, in U progu trzeciego tysiąclecia. Człowiek - Nauka - Wiara, Warsaw 2000, pp. 524–536.

== See also ==
- Polish Linguists

== Bibliography ==
- Weiss, D.; Grochowski, M., eds. (1991). Words are Physicians for an Ailing Mind: Festschrift Andrzej Bogusławski. Munich: Sagner. ISBN 978-3-87690-499-3.
- Bogusławski, Andrzej (2007). A study in the linguistics-philosophy interface. Warsaw: BEL Studio. ISBN 978-83-89968-80-7. Archived from the original on 18 July 2011.
- Bogusławski, Andrzej (2010). Dwa studia z teorii fleksji (i inne przyczynki). Warsaw: BEL Studio. ISBN 978-83-61208-46-4.
- Jacob Mey and Andrzej Boguslawski (eds) (1999). 'E Pluribus Una'. The One in the Many. (Special Issue of RASK, International Journal of Language and Communication 9/10). Odense: Odense University Press.
