= PQCC =

Production Quality Compiler-Compiler project

The Production Quality Compiler-Compiler Project (PQCC) was a long-term project led by William Wulf at Carnegie Mellon University to produce an industrial-strength compiler-compiler. PQCC would produce full, optimizing programming language compilers from descriptions of the programming language and the target machine. Though the goal of a fully automatic process was not realized, PQCC technology and ideas were the basis of production compilers from Intermetrics, Tartan Laboratories, and others.

== Objective ==
The focus of the project was on the semantics and machine-dependent phases of compilation, since lexical and syntactic analysis were already well understood. Each phase was formalized in a manner that permits expression in table-driven form. The automatic construction of the compiler then consists of deriving these tables from the semantic definitions of the language and target machine. Though this approach was largely successful for target machine description, it was less so for semantics.

== See also ==
- GNU Bison
- yacc
