= Semantic resolution tree =

A semantic resolution tree is a tree used for the definition of the semantics of a programming language. They have often been used as a theoretical tool for showing the unsatisfiability of clauses in first-order predicate logic.
