= Cliff Goddard =

Australian linguist

Cliff Goddard FAHA
- Born: 12 May 1953 (age 73); Canberra, Australia

Academic background
- Education: Australian National University

Academic work
- Main interests: semantics, pragmatics, natural semantic metalanguage, ethnopragmatics, language typology and cross-cultural linguistics

Cliff Goddard FAHA (born 5 December 1953 in Canberra) is a professor of linguistics at Griffith University, Queensland, Australia. He is, with Anna Wierzbicka, a leading proponent of the Natural Semantic Metalanguage approach to linguistic analysis. Goddard's research has explored cognitive and cultural aspects of everyday language and language use. He is considered a leading scholar in the fields of semantics and cross-cultural pragmatics. His work spans English (especially Australian English), indigenous Australian languages (Yankunytjatjara, Pitjantjatjara), and South East Asian languages (especially Malay). He was elected a Fellow of the Australian Academy of the Humanities in 2003.

== Selected publications ==
- Cliff Goddard; Anna Wierzbicka (2013). Words and Meanings: Lexical Semantics Across Domains, Languages, and Cultures. Oxford University Press. doi:10.1093/acprof:oso/9780199668434.001.0001. ISBN 978-0-19-966843-4. LCCN 2013945603. OCLC 830367893. OL 28146502M. Wikidata Q96773136.
- Goddard, Cliff, ed. (2008). Cross-Linguistic Semantics. Amsterdam: John Benjamins. ISBN 978-90-272-0569-8.
- Goddard, Cliff, ed. (2006). Ethnopragmatics: Understanding Discourse in Cultural Context. Berlin: Mouton de Gruyter. ISBN 3-11-018874-0.
- Goddard, Cliff (2005). The Languages of East and Southeast Asia: An Introduction. Oxford: Oxford University Press. ISBN 0-19-927311-1.
- Goddard, Cliff; Wierzbicka, Anna, eds. (2002). Meaning and Universal Grammar – Theory and Empirical Findings. Amsterdam/Philadelphia: John Benjamins. ISBN 90-272-3064-1.
- Goddard, Cliff (1998). Semantic Analysis – A Practical Introduction. Oxford: Oxford University Press. ISBN 0-19-870016-4.
- Goddard, Cliff; Wierzbicka, Anna, eds. (1994). Semantic and Lexical Universals – Theory and Empirical Findings. Amsterdam: John Benjamins. ISBN 90-272-3028-5.
