= JavaCC =

Parser generator written in Java

- Developer: Oracle
- Stable release: 7.0.13 / November 18, 2023; 2 years ago
- Platform: Java Virtual Machine
- Type: parser/scanner generator
- License: BSD
- Website: javacc.org
- Repository: github.com/javacc/javacc

JavaCC (Java Compiler Compiler) is an open-source parser generator and lexical analyzer generator written in the Java programming language.

JavaCC is similar to yacc in that it generates a parser from a formal grammar written in EBNF notation. Unlike yacc, however, JavaCC generates top-down parsers. JavaCC can resolve choices based on the next k input tokens, and so can handle LL(k) grammars automatically; by use of "lookahead specifications", it can also resolve choices requiring unbounded look ahead. JavaCC also generates lexical analyzers in a fashion similar to lex. The tree builder that accompanies it, JJTree, constructs its trees from the bottom up.

JavaCC is licensed under a BSD license.

== History ==
In 1996, Sun Microsystems released a parser generator called Jack. The developers responsible for Jack created their own company called Metamata and changed the Jack name to JavaCC. Metamata eventually became part of WebGain. After WebGain shut down its operations, JavaCC was moved to its current home.

== Uses ==
Software built using JavaCC includes:

- Apache Derby
- Apache Velocity
- BeanShell
- FreeMarker
- PMD
- Vaadin
- Apache Lucene
- JavaParser

== See also ==
- ANTLR
- SableCC
- Coco/R
- parboiled
