= ANTLR =

Parser generator program

- Original authors: Terence Parr and others
- Release: April 10, 1992; 34 years ago
- Stable release: 4.13.2 / 3 August 2024; 2 years ago
- Written in: Java
- Platform: Cross-platform
- License: BSD License
- Website: www.antlr.org
- Repository: github.com/antlr/antlr4

In computer-based language recognition, ANTLR (pronounced antler), or ANother Tool for Language Recognition, is a parser generator that uses a LL(*) algorithm for parsing. ANTLR is the successor to the Purdue Compiler Construction Tool Set (PCCTS), first developed in 1989, and is under active development. Its maintainer is Professor Terence Parr of the University of San Francisco.

PCCTS 1.00 was announced April 10, 1992.

== Usage ==
ANTLR takes as input a grammar that specifies a language and generates as output source code for a recognizer of that language. While Version 3 supported generating code in the programming languages Ada95, ActionScript, C, C#, Java, JavaScript, Objective-C, Perl, Python, Ruby, and Standard ML, Version 4 at present targets C#, C++, Dart, Java, JavaScript, Go, PHP, Python (2 and 3), and Swift.

A language is specified using a context-free grammar expressed using Extended Backus–Naur Form (EBNF). ANTLR can generate lexers, parsers, tree parsers, and combined lexer-parsers. Parsers can automatically generate parse trees or abstract syntax trees, which can be further processed with tree parsers. ANTLR provides a single consistent notation for specifying lexers, parsers, and tree parsers.

By default, ANTLR reads a grammar and generates a recognizer for the language defined by the grammar (i.e., a program that reads an input stream and generates an error if the input stream does not conform to the syntax specified by the grammar). If there are no syntax errors, the default action is to simply exit without printing any message. In order to do something useful with the language, actions can be attached to grammar elements in the grammar. These actions are written in the programming language in which the recognizer is being generated. When the recognizer is being generated, the actions are embedded in the source code of the recognizer at the appropriate points. Actions can be used to build and check symbol tables and to emit instructions in a target language, in the case of a compiler.

Other than lexers and parsers, ANTLR can be used to generate tree parsers. These are recognizers that process abstract syntax trees, which can be automatically generated by parsers. These tree parsers are unique to ANTLR and help processing abstract syntax trees.

== Licensing ==
ANTLR 3 and ANTLR 4 are free software, published under a three-clause BSD License. Prior versions were released as public domain software. Documentation, derived from Parr's book The Definitive ANTLR 4 Reference, is included with the BSD-licensed ANTLR 4 source.

Various plugins have been developed for the Eclipse development environment to support the ANTLR grammar, including ANTLR Studio, a proprietary product, as well as the "ANTLR 2" and "ANTLR 3" plugins for Eclipse hosted on SourceForge.

== ANTLR 4 ==
ANTLR 4 deals with direct left recursion correctly, but not with left recursion in general, i.e., grammar rules x that refer to y that refer to x.

=== Development ===
As reported on the tools page of the ANTLR project, plug-ins that enable features like syntax highlighting, syntax error checking and code completion are freely available for the most common IDEs (Intellij IDEA, NetBeans, Eclipse, Visual Studio and Visual Studio Code).

== Projects ==
Software built using ANTLR includes:

- Groovy
- Jython
- Hibernate
- OpenJDK Compiler Grammar project experimental version of the javac compiler based upon a grammar written in ANTLR
- Apex, Salesforce.com's programming language
- The expression evaluator in Numbers, Apple's spreadsheet
- Twitter's search query language
- Weblogic server
- Apache Cassandra
- Processing
- JabRef
- Trino (SQL query engine)
- Presto (SQL query engine)
- MySQL Workbench

Over 200 grammars implemented in ANTLR 4 are available on GitHub. They range from grammars for a URL to grammars for entire languages like C, Java and Go.

== Example ==
In the following example, a parser in ANTLR describes the sum of expressions can be seen in the form of "1 + 2 + 3":

// Common options, for example, the target language
options
{
  language = "CSharp";
}

// Followed by the parser 
class SumParser extends Parser;
options
{
  k = 1; // Parser Lookahead: 1 Token
}

// Definition of an expression
statement: INTEGER (PLUS^ INTEGER)*;

// Here is the Lexer
class SumLexer extends Lexer;
options
{
  k = 1; // Lexer Lookahead: 1 characters
}
PLUS: '+';
DIGIT: ('0'..'9');
INTEGER: (DIGIT)+;

The following listing demonstrates the call of the parser in a program:

TextReader reader;
// (...) Fill TextReader with character
SumLexer lexer = new SumLexer(reader);
SumParser parser = new SumParser(lexer);

parser.statement();

== See also ==
- Coco/R
- DMS Software Reengineering Toolkit
- JavaCC
- Modular Syntax Definition Formalism
- Parboiled (Java)
- Parsing expression grammar
- SableCC

== Bibliography ==
- Parr, Terence (May 17, 2007), The Definitive Antlr Reference: Building Domain-Specific Languages (1st ed.), Pragmatic Bookshelf, p. 376, ISBN 978-0-9787392-5-6, archived from the original on 2021-11-18
- Parr, Terence (December 2009), Language Implementation Patterns: Create Your Own Domain-Specific and General Programming Languages (1st ed.), Pragmatic Bookshelf, p. 374, ISBN 978-1-934356-45-6, archived from the original on 2021-10-29
- Parr, Terence (January 15, 2013), The Definitive ANTLR 4 Reference (1st ed.), Pragmatic Bookshelf, p. 328, ISBN 978-1-93435-699-9, archived from the original on April 18, 2015
