= LISP 2 =

Abandoned 1960s programming language proposal

- Paradigms: Multi-paradigm: functional, procedural, reflective, meta
- Family: Lisp
- Designed by: R. W. Mitchell, Paul W. Abrahams
- Developers: System Development Corporation, Information International, Inc.
- First appeared: 1960; 65 years ago
- Final release: Final / 1967; 58 years ago
- Typing discipline: dynamic, strong
- Scope: Lexical (static)
- Platform: IBM AN/FSQ-32, IBM 360/67, DEC PDP-6

Influenced by
- Lisp, ALGOL

LISP 2 is a programming language proposed in the 1960s as the successor to Lisp.

== History ==
It had largely Lisp-like semantics and ALGOL 60-like syntax. It is remembered mostly for its syntax, yet it had many features beyond those of early Lisps.

Early Lisps had many limits, including limited data types and slow numerics. Its use of fully parenthesized notation was also considered a problem. The inventor of Lisp, John McCarthy, expected these issues to be addressed in a later version, called notionally Lisp 2. Hence the name Lisp 1.5 for the successor to the earliest Lisp.

Lisp 2 was a joint project of the System Development Corporation and Information International, Inc., and was intended for the IBM built AN/FSQ-32 military computer. Development later shifted to the IBM 360/67 and the Digital Equipment Corporation PDP-6. The project was eventually abandoned.

== Bibliography ==
- Abrahams, Paul W.; Barnett, Jeffrey A.; Book, Erwin; Firth, Donna; Kameny, Stanley L.; Weissman, Clark; Hawkinson, Lowell; Levin, Michael I.; Saunders, Robert A. (1966). "The LISP 2 Programming Language and System" (PDF). Proceedings of the Fall Joint Computer Conference. pp. 661–676. doi:10.1145/1464291.1464362.
- Abrahams, Paul W. (1967). LISP 2 Language Specifications (PDF) (Technical report). Santa Monica, Calif.: System Development Corporation. Technical report TM-3417/200/00.
- McCarthy, John (12 February 1979). "History of Lisp".
- Mitchell, R.W. (1964). LISP 2 Specifications Proposal (PDF) (Technical report). Stanford, Calif.: Stanford Artificial Intelligence Laboratory. Memo No. 21.
