= System Development Corporation =

Computer software company based in Santa Monica, California, founded in 1955

- Type: Subsidiary
- Industry: Aerospace
- Founded: 1955; 71 years ago
- Headquarters: Santa Monica, California
- Parent: Unisys

System Development Corporation (SDC) was a computer software company based in Santa Monica, California. Initially created as a division of the RAND Corporation in December 1955 (under the name System Development Division) and established as an independent organization in October 1956, it was a very influential organization that trained a large portion of the emerging programmer workforce in the United States in the late 1950s, referred to by some as "a university for programmers."

== History ==
SDC began as the systems engineering group for the SAGE air-defense system at the RAND Corporation. In April 1955, the government contracted with RAND to help write software for the SAGE project. Within a few months, RAND's System Development Division had 500 employees developing SAGE applications. Within a year, the division had up to 1,000 employees. RAND spun off the group in 1956 as a non-profit organization that provided expertise for the United States military in the design, integration, and testing of large, complex, computer-controlled systems. SDC became a for-profit corporation in 1969, and began to offer its services to all organizations rather than only to the American military.

The first two systems that SDC produced were the SAGE system, written for the IBM AN/FSQ-7 Combat Direction Central [Q-7] computer, and the SAGE System Training Program [SSTP], written for the IBM 701 series of computers. The Q-7 was notable in that it was based on vacuum tubes. Intended as a duplex, with two computers for operational sites, there was a single Q-7 installed at the SDC complex in Santa Monica (2400 and 2500 Colorado; now occupied by the Water Garden). It was said that at the time the Q-7 building, a separate structure, required half of the air conditioning then used in the entire city of Santa Monica - perhaps in jest, but close to the truth.

In late 1961, a department of SDC became the Computer Program Integration Contractor [CPIC] for the Air Force Satellite Control Network, and maintained that role as a sole-source contractor until or shortly after 1993. In that role, SDC wrote software specifications for the AFSCN's satellite tracking system, performed system level testing of that software, created user documentation, and conducted classes in the use of the software for Air Force personnel. In order to maintain objectivity, however, the CPIC did not actually develop software. The CPIC also developed the specifications for a total replacement by IBM of the existing software system. Another department became the Computer Program Assocate Contractor [CPAC], which developed some of the software along with other companies.

=== Ownership ===
In 1981, SDC was sold by its board of directors to the Burroughs Corporation.

In 1986, Burroughs merged with the Sperry Corporation to form Unisys, and SDC was folded into Unisys Defense Systems.

In 1991, Unisys Defense Systems was renamed Paramax, a wholly owned subsidiary of Unisys, so that it could be spun off to reduce Unisys debt.

In 1995, Unisys sold Paramax to the Loral Corporation, although a small portion of it, containing some projects that had originated in SDC, remained with Unisys.

In 1996, Loral sold Paramax to Lockheed Martin.

In 1997, the Paramax business unit was separated from Lockheed Martin under the control of Frank Lanza (who had been Loral's president and CEO); and became a subsidiary of L-3 Communications.

In 2019, L-3 Communications merged with Harris Corporation to form L3Harris Technologies.

== Software projects ==
In the 1960s, SDC developed the timesharing system for the AN/FSQ-32 (Q32) mainframe computer for Advanced Research Projects Agency (ARPA). The Q-32 was one of the first systems to support both multiple users and inter-computer communications. Experiments with a dedicated modem connection to the TX-2 at the Massachusetts Institute of Technology led to computer communication applications such as email. In the 1960s, SDC also developed the JOVIAL programming language (Jules' Own Version of the International Algorithmic Language, for Jules Schwartz) and the Time-Shared Data Management System (TDMS), an inverted file database system. Both were commonly used in real-time military systems.
