= Timeline of digital preservation =

This page is a timeline of digital preservation and Web archiving. It covers various aspects of saving and preserving digital data, whether they are born-digital or not.

== Trends ==
Digital preservation encompasses a variety of efforts and technologies, so its history can be viewed through various trends in these separate efforts:

- File systems with built-in fault-tolerance
- Various changes in the physical storage used
- On-demand archiving services
- URL shortening services
- Various episodes of major archival work, sometimes as a result of services shutting down
- Efforts at converting physical/analog information to more modern digital media, file formats, and storage

== Timeline ==
Year	Month and date	Topic	Details
1972		Versioning	Marc Rochkind develops the Source Code Control System at Bell Labs.
1982	October	Physical storage	The compact disc (CD) as well as the CD player first become commercially available in Japan.
1987	June	Physical storage	The term "RAID" is invented by David Patterson, Garth A. Gibson, and Randy Katz at the University of California, Berkeley in 1987. In their June 1988 paper "A Case for Redundant Arrays of Inexpensive Disks (RAID)", presented at the SIGMOD conference, they would argue that the top performing mainframe disk drives of the time could be beaten on performance by an array of the inexpensive drives that had been developed for the growing personal computer market. Although failures would rise in proportion to the number of drives, by configuring for redundancy, the reliability of an array could far exceed that of any large single drive.
1989	November 13	Versioning	Continuous data protection, the technique of backing up computer data by automatically saving a copy of every change made to that data, is patented by British entrepreneur Pete Malcolm.
1990			Possibly the earliest reference to the term "digital preservation" (to mean converting analog media to digital and preserving in digital form) is from this year.
1996	January	Web archiving	The initial version of the command-line downloading program Wget, then known as Geturl, is released.
1996		Web archiving	The Internet Archive is founded by Brewster Kahle.
1996	April	Web archiving	Alexa Internet is founded by Brewster Kahle. Since this year, Alexa Internet has donated its crawl data to the Internet Archive.
1996			Preserving Digital Information: Report of the Task Force on Archiving of Digital Information (Donald Waters, John Garrett, eds.) is published. It became a fundamental document in the field of digital preservation that helped set out key concepts, requirements, and challenges.
1997	April 8	Web archiving	cURL, a computer software project providing a library and command-line tool for transferring data using various protocols, releases its initial version of the tool. It is known at this point as HttpGet, would briefly rename itself to urlget, and would finally rename itself to cURL in March 1998. cURL can be used to download files over a network.
1998	May	Web archiving	The first version of HTTrack, a free and open source Web crawler and offline browser, is released.
2000			The National Digital Information Infrastructure and Preservation Program (NDIIPP) launches.
2001	October	Web archiving	The Wayback Machine is launched.
2001	October 14		Version 1.0 of the Parity Volume Set specification, used in Par1, is published.
2002	January	Web archiving	TinyURL, the first notable URL shortening service, is launched.
2003	July		The International Internet Preservation Consortium is founded.
2005		Cloud storage	Box is launched as Box.net.
2005	April 7	Versioning	The initial version of Git, a version control system with support for data integrity, is released.
2005	April 29	Web archiving	Safari version 2.0 introduces the ability to save complete websites using the proprietary WebArchive format (details at Safari version history).
2005	August 1	Physical storage	The article "Kryder's Law" is published The law observes that magnetic disk areal storage density has been increasing very quickly.
2005	August	Versioning	Writely, a web-based word processor created by the software company Upstartle, launches. By January 2006, Writely would have support for revision history. Upstartle would later be acquired by Google and Writely would be integrated into Google Docs.
2005	October 31	File system	The first implementation of ZFS, a file system that includes protection against data corruption, is integrated into Solaris.
2006	March 19	Cloud storage	Amazon Web Services launches by releasing the Simple Storage Service (S3), intended for storing individual files (called objects) in a highly redundant and available fashion. S3 is designed for at least 99.999999999% durability (i.e., that percentage of objects is expected to survive after a year) and 99.99% availability (i.e., that percentage of objects is accessible at any given time). The cost of S3 storage dropped over the next decade, reaching 2.3 cents a GB effective December 1, 2016. S3 has been widely used by corporations, libraries, and governments to digitize data for long-term storage.
2007	January 30	Versioning	Microsoft Office 2007 is released. Word 2007 introduces the ability to track changes in documents.
2007	June	Cloud storage	Dropbox is founded by MIT students Drew Houston and Arash Ferdowsi, as a startup company from the American seed accelerator Y Combinator.
2007	September 21	Physical storage	The initial version of Paperkey is released. Paperkey is a free software implementation of a paper key. It extracts the essential secret bytes from an OpenPGP private key, which can then be printed to paper.
2007	October 26	Versioning	Apple releases the initial version of Time Machine.
2007		Physical storage	Two software for densely storing information on paper are released: PaperBack and Twibright Labs' Optar.
2007		Federal Agencies Digital Guidelines Initiative (FADGI)	FADGI is a collaborative effort of 20 federal agencies to articulate common sustainable practices and guidelines for digitized and born digital historical, archival and cultural content. Two working groups study issues specific to two major areas, Still Image and Audio-Visual.
2008		Web archiving	The URL shortening service Bitly is launched.
2008	April 10	Versioning	GitHub, a web-based Git repository hosting service, is launched. GitHub would popularize version control and Git. GitHub would also play an important role in encouraging people to make their source code freely available for posterity, allowing others to fork the code and acting as a de facto archive. In addition to software projects, GitHub would also be used to host code repositories for scientific research as well as for hosting and backing up websites and content.
2008	November 20	Digitizing	The prototype for Europeana launches.
2009	January 6	Web archiving	The Archive Team begins operating. Its first big effort, for which it receives press coverage, is to download GeoCities data before the service shuts down.
2009		Web archiving	SocialSafe Ltd, the company responsible for developing SocialSafe, is founded.
2009	March 23	File system	The initial version of Btrfs, a file system that supports checksums, incremental backups, and the ability to repair errors, is released as part of the Linux kernel version 2.6.29.
2009	May 15	Web archiving	The WARC file format is published as the standard ISO 28500:2009 1st edition.
2009	October 26	Web archiving	Yahoo! GeoCities, a web hosting service founded in 1994, closes its United States branch. Various attempts at archiving GeoCities are made. The site would continue to be available only in Japan.
2010	April 14	Web archiving	Twitter announces that it will donate its archive of public Tweets to the Library of Congress.
2010	December 1	Web archiving	The Memento Project provides a standard for interoperability between web archives and the live web. Memento wins the Digital Preservation Award 2010 because "Memento offers an elegant and easily deployed method that reunites web archives with their home on the live web. It opens web archives to tens of millions of new users and signals a dramatic change in the way we use and perceive digital archives."
2011	June 28	Web archiving	Google Takeout is launched by the Google Data Liberation Front.
2012	August 1	File system	Microsoft introduces ReFS. ReFS has a number of features related to digital preservation including integrity checking and data scrubbing, protection against data degradation, built-in handling of hard disk drive failure and redundancy, and integration of the RAID functionality.
2012	August 21	Cloud storage	Amazon Web Services launches Amazon Glacier, an addition to its S3 offerings with lower storage costs than S3 (initially 1 cent per GB). Glacier is intended for long-term archival in cases where retrieval is rare; therefore retrieval is costly and slow. Glacier offers the same durability as the standard S3 offering. In December 2016, the price of Glacier is reduced to 0.4 cents per GB. Glacier has been used by governments, corporations, and libraries for low-cost long-term archival. It has also been recommended for use for personal backups when frequent access is not needed.
2013	April 6	Web archiving	In the United Kingdom, the Legal Deposit Libraries (Non-Print Works) Regulations come into force, bringing digital and online material under the scope of the UK's legal deposit. Previously, the Legal Deposit Libraries Act 2003 had given the Secretary of State the powers to make regulations governing the deposit of non-print publications, but such regulations were never made at that time.
2013	April 18	Digitizing	The Digital Public Library of America launches.
2013	July 1	Web archiving	Google Reader, an RSS/Atom feed aggregator operated by Google, shuts down after having launched in 2005. The shutdown prompts an effort to archive the feed data from the service.
2013	December	Web archiving	The Memento Project is published as a standard in RFC 7089.
2017	August	Web archiving	The WARC file format is published as the standard ISO 28500:2017 2nd edition.

== See also ==
- List of digital preservation initiatives
- List of Web archiving initiatives
