= List of web archiving initiatives =

This article contains a list of web archiving initiatives worldwide. For easier reading, the information is divided in three tables: web archiving initiatives, archived data, and access methods.

Some of these initiatives may or may not make use of several web archiving file formats and/or their own proprietary file formats.

This Wikipedia page was originally generated from the results obtained for the research paper A survey on web archiving initiatives, published by the Arquivo.pt (the Portuguese web-archive) team at the time.

== Web archiving initiatives ==
Name	Country	Creation year	Technologies	Number of employees		Comments
Name	Country	Creation year	Technologies	Full-time	Part-time	Comments
End of Term Web Archive	United States	2008	Heritrix, Wayback		6–10	The End of Term Web Archive captures and saves U.S. Government federal government websites (.gov, .mil, etc.) in the Legislative, Executive, or Judicial branches of the government at the end of presidential administrations. Beginning in 2008, the EOT has thus far preserved websites from administration changes in 2008, 2012, 2016, 2020, and 2024. Project partners include CA Digital Library, Internet Archive, Webrecorder, Library of Congress, George Washington University, Stanford University, University of North Texas, the United States Government Publishing Office, and Common Crawl.
Arkiwera	Worldwide (but based in Sweden)	2020	Open source solutions and custom programming and scripts	3	4	Arkiwera is a Swedish company that maintains digital archives of websites and social media accounts for an annual fee. It supports automatic collection, replay, full-text search and data exports.
EU Web Archive	European Union	2013	Archive-It services	1		The EU Web Archive compiles the captures of the websites of the European Union institutions, which are hosted on the europa.eu domain and subdomains. Its aim is to preserve EU web content in the long term and to keep it accessible for the public. The archive was created in 2013 by the Historical Archives of the European Union and in 2018, the Publications Office of the EU took over this task and created the EU Web Archive service. The collection of archived websites is covered by the EU Legal Deposit scheme, which collects all the material produced by EU entities in a comprehensive bibliography.
Alabama State Government and Politics Web Site and Social Media Archives	United States	2005	Archive-It services			
Australia's Web Archive	Australia	1996	PANDORA Digital Archiving System (PANDAS), Heritrix, Bamboo, NLA Trove, HTTrack, Webrecorder, outbackCDX.	4	>10	The National Library of Australia leads the 'PANDORA' component of the Australian Web Archive which takes a selective approach and is a collaborative program of 10 agencies providing curatorial input. PANDORA uses the PANDAS workflow system (developed by the NLA in the late 1990s) with HTTrack as the default harvester. The National Library of Australia also conducts bulk harvesting of Australian government (the Australian Government Web Archive) websites using the Heritrix harvester and Webrecorder with a backend infrastructure (referred to as 'Bamboo') to organise content and the NLA developed outbackCDX tool to manage indexing access restrictions for content. In addition to these approaches the National Library also conducts annual harvests of the whole .au domain which is done in collaboration with the Internet Archive using Heritrix and Wayback. In 2019, PANDORA, the Australian Government Web Archive and the whole domain harvests were integrated into a new single discovery and delivery portal through the NLA's Trove discovery service.
PROMISE project	Belgium	2017	Heritrix, PyWB		7	The PROMISE project was a two-year project (2017–2019) that explored the policy-related, legal, technical and scientific issues related to archiving the Belgian web. The aim of the project was to a) identify best practices in the field of web-archiving b) develop a strategy for preserving the Belgian web c) set up a pilot for preserving and providing access to the archived Belgian web and d) make recommendations for the implementation of a sustainable web-archiving service. The project was launched by the Royal Library of Belgium and the State Archives of Belgium in collaboration with Ghent University (Research Group for Media, Innovation and Communication and Ghent Centre for Digital Humanities), Université de Namur (Research Centre in Information, Law and Society) and Haute-École Bruxelles-Brabant (Unité de Recherche et de Formation en Sciences de l'Information et de la Documentation). In October 2019 the concluding colloquium 'Saving the web: the promise of a Belgian web archive') took place at KBR. The main research findings were presented during this colloquium.
KBR web archive	Belgium	2020		1		KBR or the Belgian Royal Library is developing an operational web archive based on the findings of the PROMISE research project (2017–2019). Operational policies and technical infrastructure will be developed based on the strategy outlined in the PROMISE project.
KADOC-KU Leuven	Belgium	2022	HTTrack, Heritrix, Archiveweb.page, Replayweb.page	0	1	Thematic archive with a collection concentrated around the interaction between religion, culture and society in Belgium. In 2023 a research project Best practices for social media archiving in Flanders and Brussels ended.
MT.GOV Connect	United States	2007	Archive-It services	1		Montana State Library collection of state agency websites dating from 1996 in partial fulfillment of statutory mandate to identify, acquire, describe, and provide permanent public access to state publications. Digitized historic state publications available at https://archive.org/details/MontanaStateLibrary
Stillio	Worldwide	2011	Puppeteer, V8 engine, Gecko, WebKit, Amazon Web Services	3	4	SaaS solution for periodical website & social media archiving. Provides screenshot archiving of both static and dynamic web pages in a fixed duration which can be customized as per requirements. Helps in regulatory compliances, trend tracking, ad banner verification, version changes.
Pagefreezer	Worldwide	2009	Pagefreezer's Deep Web Crawler, Hadoop, Cassandra, Elastic Search	100		SaaS solution for website & social media archiving. Provides automatic collection, replay, full-text search and data export of websites, blogs, social media and internal communication platforms for eDiscovery and regulatory compliance with FDA, FINRA, FSA, SEC, Federal Rules of Evidence, FOIA and records management laws.
Page Vault	United States	2013				
OoCities — GeoCities Archive / GeoCities Mirror	Germany	2009				
Wikiwix Archive — Linterweb	France	2008	Selenium + MongoDB			In production on French-speaking Wikipedia since 2008, open-source project which optimizes the consumption of inodes and thus fills hard drives. Contains an annotation space for archived documents. Main developer Fabien Coulon doctor du Litis on behalf of Linterweb, hosted by Renater.
Webarchive Austria	Austria	2008	NetarchiveSuite, Heritrix, OpenWayback	1	1	
Deutsche Nationalbibliothek	Germany	2012	Tools of oia GmbH		6	The crawling for the selective web archive is done by the German company oia GmbH. The access is restricted to the reading rooms of the German National Library.
DILIMAG (Digital Literature Magazines)	Austria	2007	WebCurator		2	One technician, one for collecting and metadata.
Bibliothèque et Archives nationales du Québec (BAnQ)	Canada	2012	Heritrix, Wayback, Browsertrix		2	
Web Archiving Program at Library and Archives Canada	Canada	2005	Archive-It services	4	3	Web archiving in Canada is a legislated activity that is conducted for digital preservation purposes under section 8 (2) of the Library and Archives of Canada Act. Four FTEs and three part-time staff work on the program. Web archiving at Library and Archives Canada is also utilized to effect Legal Deposit.
Web Information Collection and Preservation - WICP (Chinese Web Archive)	China	2003	Heritrix, Wayback and NutchWAX.			
Croatian Web Archive (Hrvatski arhiv weba - HAW)	Croatia	2004	Crawl: DAMP software, Heritrix Access: Wayback, Lucene	2	2	The Croatian Web Archive (HAW) is a collection of content harvested from the Internet. In 2004 the Archive started as a concept of selective capturing of web resources. Whole .hr domain harvests have been conducted annually since 2011. as well as thematic/event harvesting for events of national interest. The content of the Archive is publicly available via HAW website. (2 librarians full time, 1 librarian part time, NUL), 2 IT professionals part time (SRCE - University of Zagreb, University Computing Centre)
Webarchiv (National Library of the Czech Republic)	Czech Republic	2000	Heritrix, Wayback and Seeder.	5	2	Czech web archive (Webarchiv) maintained by National Library of the Czech Republic focuses on archiving the Czech national web. Acquisition policy consists of three lines: selective harvests (collection of resources based on selection criteria), topic collections (focused on significant topics in the area of the Czech web) and comprehensive harvests (automatic harvests of content on the national domain). Staff contains 1 manager, 3.5 curators + 1.5 technical staff.
Netarkivet/ The Danish web archive (Royal Danish Library)	Denmark	2005	Schedule/crawling: NetarchiveSuite, Heritrix, Browsertrix, Archiveweb.page Access/search/discovery frontend and playback: SolrWayback. Still installed Wayback for alternative playback, but planning to migrate to PyWb.	1	5.5 FTE	Since 2005 the collection and preservation of the Danish part of the internet is included in the Danish Legal Deposit Law. The task is undertaken by the Royal Danish Library. There is no public access to the Danish web archive .The archive is only accessible to researchers affiliated with a Danish research institution who have requested and been granted special permission to use the collection for specific research purposes. This website https://www.kb.dk/en/find-materials/collections/netarkivet is designed to inform researchers, website owners, and other interested parties about the Danish web archive.
Estonian Web Archive	Estonia	2010	Heritrix, Squidwarc, PhantomJS and Puppeteer for screenshots of websites frontpages, Pywb, Custom Curator Tool.	3	1	Since 2006 the Legal Deposit Law allows the National Library of Estonia to collect Estonian websites as legal deposit copies. Web harvesting is done and archive is maintained by the National Library of Estonia.
Finnish Web Archive	Finland	2006	Heritrix, Solr, Pywb, Browsertrix Crawler, ArchiveWeb.page, OutbackCDX, Twarc2, YT-DLP.	3	>3	Maintained by the National Library of Finland. Annually, all *.fi domains are harvested, as well as web servers located in Finland. Outside these harvests, the library manually selects relevant websites.
BnF - Web Legal Deposit	France	2006	Heritrix, NetarchiveSuite, BCWeb, OpenWayback, SolrWayback, WARC Indexer/Solr	11		As of 2026, the BnF states that "in accordance with intellectual property law, the collections are not accessible online" and the archives can be consulted by visiting a library in France. In France, since 2006, the law on copyright and related rights in the information society (known as DADVSI) extended the scope of legal deposit to "signs, signals, writings, images, sounds or messages of any kind " communicated to the public by electronic means - in other words legal deposit of the web. Archiving the French web is a legal commitment, which continues the heritage mission of the BnF. As it is technically impossible to permanently collect all Web content, the goal of completeness from the legal deposit of printed documents has evolved into a sampling approach to create digital collections that show the production and the behaviour of French internet users.
Ina (Institut National de l'Audiovisuel)	France	2009	Crawl: PhagoSite, Crocket based on Firefox, Fantomas based on PhantomJS / Access: Vortex / Search: Dowser based on Elasticsearch	7		
Bibliotheksservice-Zentrum Baden-Württemberg	Germany	2003	Archive-It services		0.5	Websites of about 20 cities, municipalities, districts and associated corporations, and state libraries are collected by BSZ in commission within various Archive-It collections. Public access. Data storage: San Francisco (Archive-It) as well as backup with Baden-Wuerttemberg storage infrastructure.
Web archive of the German Bundestag	Germany	2005				
National Széchényi Library Web Archive	Hungary	2017	Heritrix, Wayback, PyWb, Brozzler, Webrecorder, WCT	3	2	From April 2017 till December 2019 the National Széchényi Library (https://www.oszk.hu) ran a web archiving pilot project as part of its comprehensive IT infrastructure development programme. In 2020 web archiving became a permanent service of the National Széchényi Library. From 2021 on, the legal framework was established and the web archive works according to the modified paragraphs of the cultural law and the corresponding government decree. They run thematic, event-based and domain harvests. They have a small demo collection with metadata and full-text search capabilities. The rest of the archive is not publicly available.
Vefsafn (Web Archive, National and University Library of Iceland)	Iceland	2004	Heritrix, OpenWayback			Established to comply with 2002 Icelandic law on legal deposit. Owned and maintained by the National and University Library of Iceland.
National Library of Ireland Web Archive	Ireland	2011	Archive-It services	2	1	The National Library of Ireland selectively archives Irish websites of scholarly, cultural and political importance through its NLI Selective Web Archive.
Palestine Web Archive	Palestine	2011	Heritrix, Web curator tool, Wayback, Rosetta	1	>3	National Library of Palestine collecting '.PS' domains, 1 Project Manager part time, 1 Technical Leader full time, 1 librarian part time, 1 IT Infrastructure part time.
National Central Library of Florence	Italy	2018	Archive-It services			The aim of the project is to collect and to archive digital documents and websites having "cultural interest" for Italian history and culture, according with the principles of the national legal deposit law. The Archive-it Collection is publicly available.
Web Archiving Project (WARP), The National Diet Library, Japan	Japan	2002	Heritrix, OpenWayback, Solr	4	1	Web Archiving Project (WARP) has been archiving websites since 2002. The National Diet Library Law revised in 2009 and coming into force in April 2010, allows the NDL to archive Japanese official institutions' websites: the government, the Diet, the courts, local governments, independent administrative organizations, and universities. Websites of cultural and international events held in Japan, and those related to online periodicals, are also archived based on the permission of their webmasters.
National Library of Korea - OASIS (Online Archiving & Searching Internet Sources)	Korea	2001	Own system based on Oracle DBMS and specialized search engine (IRS) that performs data management and search function.	3	11	
Bibliothèque nationale du Luxembourg	Luxembourg	2015	Heritrix, Wayback, Browsertrix, Solr	2		The National library of Luxembourg conducts quarterly broad crawls for the .lu domain as well as selective and event-based crawls. The websites that are harvested in the Luxembourg Web Archive enrich the patrimonial collections of the National library, which allows for the preservation of digital publications for future generations. Webarchive.lu is the Luxembourg Web Archive's information and participation platform.
Koninklijke Bibliotheek	Netherlands	2007	Heritrix 3.3, Web Curator Tool 3.0, Wayback, KB e-Depot system		~10	1 crawl engineer, 1 software developer, and 9 collection specialists, all part-time (equivalent to around 4 full-time). The KB selectively collects Dutch sites of research and cultural value.
National Library of Latvia	Latvia	2005	Web Curator Tool and Wayback		1	Currently only storing for preservation, access to public in development (ETA June 2012). The Latvian term for web harvesting is "rasmošana".
New Zealand Web Archive	New Zealand	1999	Web Curator Tool, Heritrix3, Webrecorder, ArchiveIT, Browsertrix, Pywb, OutbackCDX, Rosetta	5	>10	National domain harvests have been run since 2008, and annually since 2015 in collaboration with the Internet Archive. Selective harvesting is undertaken by the National Library of New Zealand primarily using the Web Curator Tool. Three full-time staff harvest websites and a number of rostered staff harvest HTML serials or HTML monographs. Supported by one dedicated web archiving engineer, and wider departmental ITMS. Digital Preservation issues are handled by staff who work with Rosetta.
The National Library of Norway	Norway	2001				
Arquivo.pt	Portugal	2007	In-house development, Heritrix, Wayback, NutchWAX, Pywb, Apache Solr, Brozzler, Webrecorder.net tools	3	4	Arquivo.pt is a research infrastructure that preserves information gathered from the web since 1996 and provides a public search service over this collection. Arquivo.pt preserves websites in several languages and provides user interfaces in English. The archived data can be automatically processed to perform Big Data research through a distributed processing platform or through Application Programming Interfaces that facilitate the development of added-value applications. The Arquivo.pt team has also contributed with scientific and technical articles related to web archiving published in open-access.
Web archive of Cacak	Serbia	2009	HTTrack		1	
Web Archive Singapore	Singapore	2006	Wayback, Heritrix, Solr	3		The Web Archive Singapore is managed by the National Library Board, Singapore (NLB). NLB conducts domain and selective archiving of websites with a focus on Singapore content. The collection is viewable at the National Library, Singapore with selected content cleared by copyright owners available online.
Digital Resources (University Library in Bratislava)	Slovak Republic	2015	Heritrix 3.11.0, OpenWayback 2.4.0, Solr 5.2.1, Custom Curator Tool, Archivewebpage.org	1	1	The University Library in Bratislava (ULIB) performed the first experiments of webharvesting in 2008–2009. In 2015 ULIB carried into operation a platform for web- and e-Born archiving (during the implementation of the national project "Digital resources", that was supported by the European regional development fund) - www.webdepozit.sk/).
Slovenian Web Archive	Slovenia	2007	Heritrix, OpenWayback, Web Curator Tool	1		
Archivo de la Web Española	Spain	2009	NetarchiveSuite, Heritrix, OpenWayback, CWeb, Solr	3+supervisor	2 at BNE, more at regional libraries	Maintained by the National Library of Spain with the collaboration of regional conservation centres in the autonomous communities. Mixed approach of bulk and selective harvests. Bulk crawls of the .es domain conducted annually since 2009, initially in collaboration with the Internet Archive (2009–2013) independently since 2014 using NetarchiveSuite. Since 2015, bulk crawls (in collaboration with regional libraries) also cover the .gal, .cat, and .eus. The Legal Deposit Law (Real Decreto 635/2015) authorises the libraries to collect Spanish websites. Full content is accessible only on-site at the BNE and at regional conservation centres.
PADICAT: The Web Archive of Catalonia	Spain	2005	Browsertrix crawler, Pywb, outbackcdx		2	PADICAT is the open access Web Archive of Catalonia, created by the Biblioteca de Catalunya: the public institution responsible for collecting, preserving and distributing the bibliographic heritage of Catalonia, in Spain.
ONDARENET - Basque Digital Heritage Archive	Spain	2008	Heritrix, Wayback, NutchWAX and Web Curator.	1		Archive of Basque digital heritage.
Kulturarw3 (Sweden)	Sweden	1996	NetarchiveSuite, Heritrix. Inhouse system for storage, maintenance and access, but moving to pywb or SolrWayback.		1.25	The Swedish web harvesting project started in 1996 and the first harvest was performed in 1997. In 2002 daily harvests of certain newspaper web sites were added. There was a pause in operation November 2009 - May 2011, but a harvest for 2010 was made with the help of the Internet Archive. No domain harvests were made in 2016, 2018 and 2019 due to problems with the harvesting platform. The daily harvests of newspaper websites were paused between May 2017 and December 2018, but was the expanded to cover all Swedish newspaper web sites on a daily basis. Since April 2013 the National Library of Sweden also receives online material through the Legal Deposit Act for Electronic Material.
Aleph Archives	Switzerland, United States	2010	Web archiving platform, capture domain name, high performance search engine, Near real time indexing, Web Monitoring tools	>10		Automatic web archiving platform for online capture and preservation. Support eDiscovery with powerful and qualitative technology. Aimed to corporations, institutions and agencies seeking to capture, preserve and leverage their Web content; dynamic websites, wikis, social media, forums, comments, disclaimers, and ads, for compliance (FDA, FINRA, FSA, SEC, FOIA), marketing or pure preservation purposes.
Expatriate Archive Centre Blog Archive	The Hague, The Netherlands	2019	Archive-It services			The focus of this project is blogs written by any people who have lived abroad. We preserve these blogs and their contents because we recognise their cultural and historical value. Adding a blog archive to our collection will enrich the research opportunities for students and other academics who choose the us as a place of study. The archived blogs will be selected based on very specific criteria and their quality will be checked on a regular basis.
Web Archiving Bucket	Switzerland, United States, Canada	2012	WARC Software Development Kit, Cobalt, Holon web server			The "Web Archiving Bucket" is an initiative launched by Aleph Archives, to preserve data and provide libraries and organizations with free-to-use web archiving tools and components. The Web Archiving Bucket provides set of tools to help archivists and professionals in their daily work.
Web Archive Switzerland	Switzerland	2008	Heritrix, Wayback, Pywb, Webrecorder, Browsertrix		6	2 crawl engineers, 3 persons for quality assurance (sharing less than 1 full time), 1 coordinator. The curators, who do the selection, are partner libraries all over Switzerland.
NTU Web Archiving System, NTUWAS	Taiwan	2007	Lucene		3	
Web Archive Taiwan	Taiwan	2007				
UK Web Archive	United Kingdom	2004	Heritrix, Web Curator Tool, Wayback, Solr for searching.			
UK Government Web Archive (UKGWA)	United Kingdom	2003	MirrorWeb	7	1	The UK National Archives' UK Government Web Archive (UKGWA) is a fully open web archive. It includes over 5,000 central government websites and social media taken at regular intervals (1996 to present). The scope of UKGWA is outlined in the OSP27 document. Technical side of web archiving operation is supplied by MirrorWeb.
UK Parliament Web Archive	United Kingdom	2009	MirrorWeb	1	2	The UK Parliament Web Archive captures, preserves, and make accessible UK Parliament information published on the web. The web archive includes websites and social media dating from 2009 to the present. The technical side of web archiving operation is supplied by MirrorWeb.
EU Exit Web Archive	United Kingdom	2020	MirrorWeb			The UK National Archives' EU Exit Web Archive is a fully open web archive. It contains a wide selection of documents taken from EUR-Lex (the European legislation website), including Treaties, legislative documents, the Official Journal of the EU, case law and other supporting materials, and judgements of the European Court of Justice in English, French and German. The collection contains all content published up to the completion of the implementation period, at 11pm GMT on 31 December 2020. It provides a comprehensive and official UK reference point for EU law as it stood at the end of the implementation period. The technical side of web archiving operation is supplied by MirrorWeb.
MirrorWeb	Worldwide	2012	Heritrix, PYWB for public archives, custom replay for archives inside the MirrorWeb platform. Custom social media archiving tools.	40		MirrorWeb provides a website and social media archiving platform for financial services and the public sector entities. They run a range of public archives, two of which include; the UK Government Web Archive and the UK Parliament Web Archive.
Internet Archive (provides Archive-it service)	United States	1996	Heritrix, Zeno, Wayback, NutchWAX and other tools developed by the Internet Archive	150		Internet Archive's Wayback Machine is the largest and oldest web archive in the world, dating back to 1996. Internet Archive also provide various web archiving services, including Archive-IT, Save Page Now, and domain level contract crawls. The Wayback Machine is the publicly available access service to Internet Archive and partners' collections.
Stanford University Libraries	United States	2007	Heritrix, HTTrack, Wayback, CDL Web Archiving Service, Internet Archive Archive-It	2	5	Stanford University Libraries has been engaged in web archiving projects since 2007 and started establishing a web archiving program in 2013. Collections that SUL is engaged in include Stanford University Archives, Bay Area Governments, Congressional Research Service (CRS) Reports, Freedom of Information Act (FOIA), Fugitive US Executive Agencies and many more. SUL is also involved in collaborative web archiving projects like the Archive of the California Government Domain, CA.gov with libraries at the University of California and the CA State Library, the End of Term Web Archive, and the Ivy Plus Libraries Confederation.
Columbia University Libraries	United States	2009	Archive-It services	2	>1	The Columbia University Libraries (CUL) web resources collection program archives selected websites in thematic areas corresponding to existing CUL collection strengths, websites produced by affiliates of Columbia University, and websites from organizations or individuals whose papers or records are held in CUL's physical archives. Began web archiving in 2008.
Cornell University Library	United States	2011	Archive-It services	1	>1	
North Carolina State Government Web Site Archives	United States	2005	Archive-It services		3	
Latin American Web Archiving Project	United States	2005	Archive-It services			
Web Archiving Project for the Pacific Islands	United States	2009	Archive-It services		4	
Library of Congress Web Archives	United States	2000	Heritrix, Wayback, and the DigiBoard, an in-house curatorial/permissions tool	6	80	The part-time workers spend a few hours per month (on average) selecting content for the collections.
Harvard Library	United States	2006	Archive-It		>10	Harvard Library web collections consist of 10 curatorial units' collections, with variable staff contributing to both technical and curatorial activities. Harvard is also involved in collaborative web collecting through the Ivy Plus Libraries Confederation. Harvard Library initiated web archiving activities in 2006 using a self-developed Web Archive Collection Service (WAX) and transitioned to Archive-It in 2017.
Harvard Library	United States	2013	Perma.cc			
Web Archiving Service from California Digital Library (WAS service)	United States	2005	Heritrix, Wayback, NutchWAX	4	>1	The number of hours that curators devote to the service is very variable.
Bentley Historical Library (University of Michigan) Web Archives	United States	2000	HTTrack, Teleport Pro, WAS service (2010-)		2	
University of Texas at San Antonio Web Archives	United States	2009	Archive-It		3	The number of hours varies dependent upon how the crawls are scheduled.
qumram	Switzerland	2010	qumram Web Archiving / Web Information Governance Software Suite			Commercial web archiving / web information governance software suite. Provides both remote harvesting as well as transactional web archiving. Allows integrations with any possible web application (WCMS, Portal, SharePoint, eShop, custom applications) as well as repository (database, file system, electronic archive or records management system, cloud-based solution). Allows capturing and reproduction of public information as well as specific user interactions.
SAPERION	Germany	2011	SAPERION ECM Web Content Archive			Commercial enterprise content management suite specializes on regulatory compliance. The product provides both harvesting as well as transactional web archiving based on the integration of qumram's Chronos Web Archiving Software Suite. Web content is just another channel from which content is reaching SAPERION. Others may be scanner, fax, e-mail, mobile devices, office suites or any other system creating content like ERP systems.
Bibliotheca Alexandrina's Internet Archive	Egypt	2002	Heritrix, OpenWayback, WARCrefs	3		Current crawling interests: Egypt beyond January 25, Arab League ccTLDs. Deduplication: using WARCrefs tool to deduplicate Web archive content in BA cluster OpenWayback: handling big data indexing by using ZipNumCluster to locate a certain URI in compressed CDX files.
AUEB Web Archive	Greece	2010	Heritrix, Wayback and NutchWAX.	1	1	This project is part of the function of the University Library.
World Bank Web Archives	United States	2007	HTTrack crawler, Oracle RDBMS, Google Search Appliance	0	3	
Russian National Digital Archive	Russia	2010	wpull, grab-site, HTTrack crawler, ad-hoc scripts developed for social media archiving. Experimenting: Heritrix, Wayback			About 5000 government websites collected (May 2018) using wpull and provided as archives for downloading.
Archive Team	Worldwide	2009	wpull, ad hoc scripts	1	~100	Volunteer group. They partially archived GeoCities, Yahoo! Videos, Google Video and others.
WikiTeam	Worldwide	2011	ad hoc scripts	0	0	Volunteers group. Over 20,000 wikis preserved.
University of North Texas CyberCemetery	United States	1997	Heritrix, Wayback; formerly HTTrack		2	The CyberCemetery is an archive of government websites that have ceased operation (usually websites of defunct government agencies and commissions that have issued a final report). This collection features a variety of topics indicative of the broad nature of government information. In particular, this collection features websites that cover topics supporting the university's curriculum and particular program strengths.
archive.today	Worldwide	2012	Apache Accumulo, HDFS, Chromium, ad hoc scripts	1	1	On-demand web archival service. Can archive HTML, CSS and images on the page. Also saves content generated by JavaScript.
Greek Web Archive Portal	Greece	2022	Heritrix, Wayback	0	1	The Greek Web Archive Portal is a service provided by the National Library of Greece (NLG). It allows users to navigate through the historical content of the Greek Web, a separate collection of web content that includes snapshots of all .gr domain sites from 1996 up to the present day, harvested by the Internet Archive. The service was developed in collaboration with the Internet Archive and provides search either by keyword or by URL, covering web pages as well as other types of files: images, audio files, videos and PDFs.
ΕΣΑΕΙ Web Archive – National Archiving System of Greek Web	Greece	2017	Heritrix, Open Wayback, Solr, Netarchive Suite	0	4	The ΕΣΑΕΙ project was the first attempt to harvest all .gr content and get to know its dimensions. It was implemented by the National Library of Greece in collaboration with the Athens University of Economics and Business and it included two bulk and three selective harvests, regarding the collections of "Local Government", "News" and "Education“. NLG Curator Tool was created for the playback of the collection.
Tamiment Library and Robert F. Wagner Labor Archives at New York University	United States	2007	WAS Service	1	1	Archives websites related to New York City and National Labor and Left Movements. Projects include: Alternative Mass Media / News; Anarchism; Animal Rights; Arts and Cultural Left; Civil Rights and Civil Liberties; Communism, Socialism, Trotskyism; Economic and Social Justice (Including Occupy Wall Street); Education and Student Movements; Electoral Politics and Parties / Political Action (U.S. Left); Environmentalism / Green Movement; Feminism and Women's Movements; Guantanamo Bay Detention Camp & War Crimes (U.S.); Housing; Internet/Cyberspace Democracy; Jewish American Progressive & Left Activity; Labor Unions and Organizations (U.S.); Left Academia and Theory, Intellectuals and Other Notables; LGBT Rights; Other Left Activism; Peace Movements; Prisoners Rights and Political Prisoners; Progressive Policy/ Educational Organizations.
Preservica	Worldwide	2012	Heritrix, Preservica core product, Wayback			Cloud-based heterogeneous archiving service that allows ingest from multiple sources (including web archiving ingest via Heritrix). Ability to migrate content within WARC files and render in Wayback. Ingest runs as workflow so very little effort needed to run it.
Central State Electronic Archives of Ukraine	Ukraine	2007	HTTrack, Wget	2		Archives interested in keeping websites and creating the thematic collections of such websites, Is presently in storage the Archives collections of websites which includes the topic of presidential elections in Ukraine from 2010 until today, about the Chornobyl disaster, the local elections, of Euro 2012 in Ukraine, UNESCO World Heritage sites in Ukraine, the 200th anniversary of the birth of Taras Shevchenko.
York University Libraries, York University Libraries Wayback Machine	Canada	2012	Browsertrix, pywb	1	0	
New York Art Resources Consortium (NYARC)	United States	2012	Archive-It services	1	~3	Collaboration among Frick Art Reference Library, Brooklyn Museum Library & Archives, and Museum of Modern Art (MoMA) Library to archive specialist art historical web resources.
Netherlands Institute for Sound and Vision (Sound and Vision) web archive	Netherlands	2011	Heritrix, Elasticsearch for full-text index, Drupal for front-end		~7	Sound and Vision has been involved in web archiving projects since 2008, starting with the EU research project LiWA. After a couple of pilots, web archiving projects were scaled up in 2014.
Saving Ukrainian Cultural Heritage Online	United States	2022	Browsertrix, ArchiveWeb.page			
Rhizome (organization)	United States	1999	ArtBase, Conifer	3	1	Rhizome operates a digital preservation program, led by Dragan Espenschied, which is focused on the creation of free, open source software tools to decentralize web archiving and software preservation practices and ensure access to its collections of born-digital art. Conifer was Rhizome's web archiving service offering; it closed in June 2026.
University of Texas at Austin Libraries, Human Rights Documentation Initiative	United States	2009	Archive-It services	1	1	The University of Texas Libraries' Human Rights Documentation Initiative (HRDI) captures the websites of human rights organizations in order to provide secure access to human rights documentation in the event that these often-fragile sites are taken down.
Kentucky Department for Libraries and Archives	United States	2009	Archive-It, Wayback	>1	0	This collection includes captures of websites for Kentucky state agencies in the Executive, Legislative, and Judicial Branches. Stand-alone websites for boards, councils, committees, quasi-governmental agencies, and agency programs are also archived. Captures for websites dating 2000–2008 are included in this collection via a transfer to our account from the Wayback Machine.
University of California, San Francisco Library	United States	2007	Archive-It, Wayback, CDL WAS Service	>1	0	This collection documents the web presences of UCSF, as well as the larger health science focuses of AIDS history; anesthesiology; biotechnology and biomedical research; tobacco control and regulation; neuroscience; and computational medicine. Staff is one full-time digital archivist with various responsibilities in addition to web-archives.
Ivy Plus Libraries Confederation	United States	2013	Archive-It, Conifer	1	1	The Ivy Plus Libraries Confederation's Web Resources Collection Program is a collaborative collection development effort to build curated, thematic collections of freely available, but at-risk, web content in order to support research at participating Libraries and beyond. Participating Libraries are: Brown, Chicago, Columbia, Cornell, Dartmouth, Duke, Harvard, Johns Hopkins, MIT, Penn, Princeton, Stanford, and Yale. Collections are accessible via Archive-It.
Malaysian Government Web Archive (MyGWA)	Malaysia	2017	Wayback, WGET, WPULL	>1	0	National Archive of Malaysia started to archive websites of public sector in Malaysia since 2017.
HTTP Archive		2010				Crawls popular websites for Data analysis.
National Library of Medicine (U.S.)	United States	2009	Archive-It, Conifer		~8	NLM web collecting is guided by the Collection Development Guidelines of the National Library of Medicine and other strategic collecting efforts. Collections include Global Health Events, the Opioid Epidemic, HIV/AIDS, Health and Medicine Blogs, and NLM's own web presence.
Smithsonian Libraries and Archives (U.S.)	United States	2000	Heritrix, Archive-It, Webrecorder, Conifer, Browsertrix, other		5	The Smithsonian Libraries and Archives collects websites and social media accounts that document the history of the Institution.
Ghost Archive		2021	ReplayWeb.page			On-demand web archival service. Can archive HTML, CSS, images, JavaScript on the page and YouTube videos.
Common Crawl	United States	2008	Apache Nutch, Apache Tika, pywb, in-house tools	9	7	Non-profit foundation.
GFNDC	United States (global nodes in EU, CA, JP)	2007	Custom ingest pipelines, symbolic shell emulators, legacy interface crawlers	9	60+ affiliated	The Global Foundation for the Neglect of Digital Culture (GFNDC) is a nonprofit initiative focused on symbolic digital preservation and archival innovation. Founded in 2007 and based in San Francisco, it maintains infrastructure for cold storage, interface emulation, and metadata anomaly tracing across decentralized archival nodes. Its activities include legacy web archiving, UI simulation, protocol archaeology, and research on digital cultural loss. Referenced in the GFNDC Annual Report 2024 (PDF) and related preservation literature.
WebCite	Canada	1997		1		On-demand web archival service. Could archive HTML, CSS, images, JavaScript on the page and PDF files. Not accepting new archive requests.
Megalodon	Japan	2005				On-demand web archival service.
Chinese University of Hong Kong Web Archive	Hong Kong	2021	MirrorWeb			University Archives web archiving initiative; portal for web crawls over 190 University websites (crawled once or twice a year) and “powered by” MirrorWeb.
Internet Information Resource Preservation and Protection (National Library of China)	China	2003	IIPC-recommended web archiving toolset (trialled) + in-house platform development			Started experimental collection/preservation of internet resources from 2003, establishing an "Internet Information Preservation and Protection Centre" in 2009, and launching the "Internet Information Strategic Preservation Project" in 2019.

== Archived data ==
Name	Archived Contents (millions)	Disk Space Occupied (TB)	Archive Format	TLD/Broad Crawls	Selective Crawls (Yes/No)	Comments
EU Web Archive			WARC	.EU	Y	.EU 250 websites in europa.eu domain and subdomains, crawled once per quarter + ad hoc crawls on request of website owners (selective crawls). Status Feb 2019.
Australia's Web Archive	11000	600	WARC	.AU	Y	.AU crawls (1996–2018): 10.15 billion files (530 TB). Selective crawls (1996–2019): 755 million files (44 TB). AGWA (2011–2018): 525 million files (58 TB).
Our digital island, a Tasmanian Web Archive		0.336	HTTrack		Y	Preserves online content related to Tasmania. ODI has operated since its inception under the assumption that web sites fall within the definition of 'Book' in the Tasmanian Library Act 1984. Thus, no permission to capture from publishers is required.
Webarchive Austria	4095	164	ARC	.AT, .wien, .tirol	Y	A copy of the data is stored in a high security data storage unit.
Deutsche Nationalbibliothek			WARC	.DE	Y	Only one experimental TLD crawl.
DILIMAG (Digital Literature Magazines)	0.03	0.996	ARC			Project from 2007-03-01 until 2010-12-23. The project DILIMAG for collecting, describing and archiving of digital German literary magazines.
Bibliothèque et Archives nationales du Québec (BAnQ)	167	31	ARC/WARC		Y	Harvesting began in 2009. Selective crawls of Quebec websites.
Government of Canada Web Archive (GCWA)	1750	70	ARC/WARC	.GC.CA	Y	Web archiving at Library and Archives Canada (LAC) began in 2005 and concentrated on collecting the federal government web presence and capturing the federal elections, the Olympics, and Canadian commemorative events. Thematic web collections of Canadiana research interest have been curated as an ongoing program activity since 2009.
Web Information Collection and Preservation - WICP (Chinese Web Archive)				.GOV.CN	Y	Harvest of the web pages about the events that have great influence on the society, economy and so on, and the sites in 'gov.cn' domain.
Croatian Web Archive (Hrvatski arhiv weba - HAW)	231	13	Mirror, WARC	.HR	Y	Since 2004 selective harvesting over 5000 web resources. Since 2011 annual harvesting of national .hr domain as well as thematic harvesting. All archived content is publicly available via HAW website.
Webarchiv (National Library of the Czech Republic)	9412	350	ARC/WARC	.CZ	Y	Harvesting began in 2001.
Netarkivet/ The Danish web archive (Royal Danish Library)	36000	634	ARC/WARC	.DK	Y	+36 billion objects: html : 19077101525; image : 5859756918; other : 4080719309; text : 757030275; pdf : 97318057; audio : 8166680; video : 7085143; word : 47510; powerpoint : 5660; excel : 4721; Snapshot harvesting; Selective harvesting; Event harvesting; Special harvesting
Estonian Web Archive	874	56	ARC/WARC	.EE	Y	Archive consists selective, event and topical crawls since 2010. Whole national domain crawls are done yearly since 2015. Besides TLD .ee, Estonia related web content is harvested from other TLD-s like .eu, .org, .com etc.
Finnish Web Archive	4300	300	ARC/WARC / .json / .mp4	.FI, .AX	Y	Also crawls content hosted on machines physically located in Finland, independently from their domain.
BnF - Web Legal Deposit	48 000	1 800	ARC/WARC	.FR + all sites hosted in France	Y	BnF is making copies of all sites in the .FR TLD, as well as all sites hosted and produced in France, ignoring both the Robots exclusion standard and the licenses of the documents.
BnL Web-Archive	543	41	WARC	.LU	Y	The BnL conducts 2 domain crawls per year, as well as event-based and selective crawls.
Ina (Institut National de l'Audiovisuel)	105800	2359	DAFF		Y	As of 2021-03-08: DAFF handles full content deduplication, so the size on disk takes into account compression and deduplication; the equivalent disk storage in compressed ARC format would be approximately 10 PB.
E-diaspora (Télécom ParisTech, FMSH)	1030	13	DAFF		Y	DAFF handles full content deduplication, so the size on disk takes into account compression and deduplication; the equivalent disk storage in compressed ARC format would be approximately 51 TB
Internet Memory Foundation		180	WARC	Can be done by partners	Y	Formerly European Archive. Collaborate with Internet Memory Research, which provides the ArchiveTheNet Service (ATN Service). Selective crawls (140 TB), Domain crawls (40 TB), expect to grow to 1PB in 2012. New datacenter and a new crawler in 2012.
Bibliotheksservice-Zentrum Baden-Württemberg		9	WARC		Y	Websites of about 20 cities, municipalities, districts + their associated corporations, and state libraries are collected by BSZ in commission within various Archive-It collections. Public access. Data storage: San Francisco (Archive-It) as well as backup with Baden-Wuerttemberg storage infrastructure.
Web archive of the German Bundestag					Y	German Federal Parliament. Selective. At regular intervals or at certain events are snapshots (snapshots) of www.bundestag.de and other web presences of the German Bundestag made. These are available in the web archive to date available.
Vefsafn (Web Archive, National and University Library of Iceland)						Limited to the .is top-level domain and a selection of Icelandic websites within other top-level domains.
Palestine Web Archive			ARC/WARC	.PS	Y	.PS crawls (2006–2011): Pilots Crawls (500 GB). Selective crawls (1996, 2011).
Web Archiving Project (WARP), The National Diet Library, Japan	12670	1313	WARC		Y	as of March 2023; 15 TB of selective crawls based on permission (2002–2010). Started the web archiving of official institution sites based on the legislation from April 2010.
National Library of Korea - OASIS (Online Archiving & Searching Internet Resource)		24			Y	Requires consent before archiving. Targets 56,401 websites. Web archiving is managed under Digital Resource Management Systems. In 2011, the web archiving system will be rebuilt.
Koninklijke Bibliotheek	407	36	WARC		Y	Selective crawls (annually) of ca. 20,400 sites (December 2020).
New Zealand Web Archive	4300	260	ARC/WARC	.NZ	Y	.NZ crawls (2008–2023): 4+ billion URLS (260TB). Selective crawls 33,500 websites (ca. 9TB). Legal deposit covers born digital material (including websites).
The National Library of Norway						
Arquivo.pt	21 118	1 455	ARC/WARC	Focused on .PT but also other domains	Y	.PT domain crawls and integration of external collections since 2007 and daily crawls of a selection of online publications of since 2010. Selective crawls related to national events such as elections or international content related to science such as websites about Research & Development projects funded by the European Union.
Web archive of Cacak	0.255	0.013	HTTrack		Y	Selective crawls of 130 sites related to the city of Cacak. Collaboration with the Webarchiv team from the National Library of the Czech Republic.
Web Archive Singapore			WARC	.SG	Y	Selective crawls of Singapore-related sites and .SG domain archiving.
Digital Resources (University Library in Bratislava)	2 636	103	WARC	.SK + other TLDs with Slovacical content	Y	Harvesting of the Slovak web started in 2015. Since then ULB has performed seven (2016 - 2025) full-domain harvests (harvesting of the national .SK domain), multiple selective crawls and thematic crawls (topic centered and event devoted campaigns).
Slovenian Web Archive		30	WARC			Selective crawls since 2007, national domain crawls since 2014.
Archivo de la Web Española	>300	>3000	WARC	.ES, .GAL, .CAT, .EUS	Y	TLD-based crawls. Selective crawls for elections, events, thematic collections and daily news media. Statistics are as of 2025. In 2024 alone, approximately 8,970 websites and ~300 TB were collected across thematic collections.
PADICAT: The Web Archive of Catalonia	620	32,5	ARC/WARC	.CAT	Y	In accordance with the general trend, the archive model is a hybrid system consisting: Mass compilation of open-access digital resources published on the Internet (.cat); Systematic archiving of the web site output of Catalan organizations; Fostering of lines of research through themed integration of the digital resources pertaining to specific events in Catalan public life (elections, museums, etc.).
Basque Digital Heritage Archive	21	0.8	ARC		Y	Archive of Basque digital heritage.
Kulturarw3 (Sweden)	5700	360	Multipart MIME	.se, Swedish .nu and geolocation for other tld's	Y	Bulk crawls approximately twice a year. Selective crawls of about 140 newspapers every day.
Aleph Archives	>10000000	>25	Native HTML, WARC, WARC2, ARC and HTTrack to WARC migration tools		Y	Automatic web archiving platform for online capture and preservation. Support eDiscovery with powerful and qualitative technology. Aimed to corporations, institutions and agencies seeking to capture, preserve and leverage their Web content; dynamic websites, wikis, social media, forums, comments, disclaimers, and ads, for compliance (FDA, FINRA, FSA, SEC, FOIA), marketing or pure preservation purposes.
Web Archive Switzerland		80	ARC, WARC		Y	Mainly selected .ch crawls.
NTU Web Archiving System, NTUWAS	200	14			Y	
Web Archive Taiwan						
The UK Web Archive		20.6	WARC		Y	Selective crawls with previous permission. Now also conducting wholesale UK domain-scale crawls under Non-Print Legal Deposit legislation, enacted April 2013. This content will only be available on premises controlled by one of the six legal deposit libraries. The UKWA is a spin-off from the UK Web Archiving Consortium that ended in 2007.
Hanzo Archives		7	WARC		Y	Commercial web archiving services and appliances, for government and corporations whose compliance or legal obligations / needs extend to their websites, intranet, and social media. Many 'dark' archives across Europe and USA.
UK Government Web Archive	1000 +	150	ARC WARC post July 2017			Between 2003 - 2005 the Internet Archive undertook the technical side of web archiving on behalf of The UK Government Web Archive. Between 2005 - July 2017 the technical side of the web archiving service was contracted out to the Internet Memory Foundation. From July 2017 MirrorWeb took over the contract and moved the entire archive to the cloud. The UK Government Web Archive was part of the UK Web Archiving Consortium from 2004 - 2009.
Internet Archive (provides Archive-it service)	690000	21000		Worldwide	Y	Provides the Archive-it service and leads the Archive-access project (Internet Archive ARC access tools). Collection is mirrored at Bibliotheca of Alexandrina in Egypt.
Columbia University Libraries Web Resources Collection Program	723	50.4	ARC/WARC		Y	Selective crawls with permission or notification. Thematic collections in: Human rights; New York City built environment; New York City religions; Resistance. Also capture Columbia University web domain.
North Carolina State Government Web Site Archives	51.5	3.8	WARC		Y	
Latin American Web Archiving Project					Y	
Web Archiving Project for the Pacific Islands	5.5		ARC/WARC		Y	Includes sites of 18 countries.
Library of Congress Web Archives	7741	420	ARC/WARC		Y	Formerly MINERVA. Selective crawls with notification and permission; primarily event and thematic collections.
Harvard University Library: the Web Archive Collection Service (WAX)	19	0.661	ARC		Y	Selective crawls with no previous authorization.
Web Archiving Service from California Digital Library (WAS service)	216	25.2	ARC/WARC	Can be done by partners	Y	Provides Web Archiving Service (WAS) to partners worldwide. Was developed at the California Digital Library.
Bentley Historical Library (University of Michigan) Web Archives	34.5	2.6	ARC/WARC		Y	WAS service since 2010.
University of Texas at San Antonio Web Archives	26	1.135	ARC/WARC		Y	University administration, faculty and student sites; as well as selective captures on San Antonio and South Texas subject areas, including San Antonio organizations; San Antonio Online Journals and Blogs; Tejano and Conjunto music; Gay, Lesbian, Bisexual, Transgender and Queer Related Web sites in Texas, San Antonio and the Rio Grande Valley; Immigration/Borderlands; Mexican Cooking Blogs; San Antonio Restaurants; Renewable Energy in Texas; Rio Grande Valley Organizations; and Rio Grande Watershed and Texas Water Issues.
AUEB Web Archive	3		WARC	aueb.gr	N	The amount of data crawled from the domain aueb.gr ranges between 10GB and 14.9GB. The data is stored on disk compressed and requires between 8.8GB and 9.7GB, resulting in space savings between 12% and 35%. In the case of new crawl, we can only store on disk the Web pages that change since the previous crawl. Consequently, we crawled 13.1GB from the domain aueb.gr, but we only stored on disk 1.6GB, resulting in space savings of 88%.
World Bank Web Archives		0.143	HTTrack	no, so far	Y	450 sites with historical or research value have been harvested since 2007, each archived before being taken offline or before a major upgrade.
University of North Texas CyberCemetery		0.887	WARC	.gov	Y	
Bibliotheca Alexandrina's Internet Archive	80000	1000	ARC/WARC	Egyptian news and politics	Y	
York University Digital Library		0.435	WARC	yorku.ca + faculty requests	Y	
Netherlands Institute for Sound and Vision (Sound and Vision) web archive			ARC/WARC		Y	Among other av-heritage, Sound and Vision is tasked with archiving programmes broadcast by Dutch Public Broadcasters. Therefore, an important part of the web archive consists of websites of public broadcaster related to these programmes. Furthermore, websites are archived that do not have a direct link to the collection, but that are of interest in a broader, media-historical way. Examples are websites of commercial broadcasters.
Kentucky Department for Libraries and Archives	3	0.3007	WARC		Y	
University of California, San Francisco Library	12.5	0.587	ARC/WARC		Y	Websites requested by staff and faculty, and growing list attempting to capture all UCSF websites as comprehensively as possible.
Ivy Plus Libraries Confederation	347	16	ARC/WARC		Y	Selective crawls with notification. Thematic collections in politics and political protests, architecture, composers, design, gaming, geology, webcomics, documentary films, art, religion, sexuality, climate change, and more.
Malaysian Government Web Archive (MyGWA)		10	WARC	.GOV.MY	Y	Crawls only Malaysian public sector websites only. View is by subject, i.e. administration, economy, security, and social.
National Library of Medicine (U.S.)	122	9.1	WARC		Y	
Smithsonian Libraries and Archives (U.S.)		10	WARC		Y	
Common Crawl	300 000	10 000	ARC/WARC	worldwide	Y	Additional data products such as a graph of the web, and parquet indexes of urls and hosts.
GFNDC	6700	1120	WARC, FFV1, FLAC, JSONL	Multiple (.com, .net, .org, historical ccTLDs)	Y	Global archive spanning user-generated content, obsolete web platforms, and interface artifacts. Indexes include defunct CMS exports, blog comment trees, forum structures, and visual UI states. Selective crawls emphasize digital ephemera recovery and platform shutdown captures. Data verified across five mirrored nodes. Status: Active (2025).
Chinese University of Hong Kong Web Archive					Y	Collection comprises web crawls over 190 University websites; sites are crawled once or twice a year (selective, institution-scoped).
Internet Information Resource Preservation and Protection (National Library of China)					Y	NLC preserves important websites and major thematic resources; the 2019 "Internet Information Strategic Preservation Project" is described as a distributed “socialized preservation” model with partner-run preservation bases (e.g., Sina).

== Access methods ==
Name	URL history (Yes/No)	Meta-data (catalog/advanced) search (Yes/No)	Full-text search (Yes/No)	Memento Compliance (No/Native/Proxy)	Comments
EU Web Archive		Y	Y	Y	Freely accessible to all via .
Australia's Web Archive	Y	Y	Y	No	Selected sites are publicly available through a directory structure. Domain harvests are not. The PANDORA Archive is indexed and searchable through the NLA's single search service Trove. The Australian Domain Harvests are full-text indexed but are not currently publicly available. The Australian Government Web Archive is searchable by URL and full-text indexes through its portal.
Our digital island, a Tasmanian Web Archive	Y	Y	N	No	Presents thumbnails generated through Html To Image supplemented in HTTrack. Information is organized in directory: A-Z Subject listing, A-Z Title listing.
Webarchive Austria	Y	N	Y	No	Possible to search online for versions either by URL or in (partial) fulltext. The websites are only accessible on special terminals at the Austrian National Library. Has bookmarking feature which allows to save versions online and recall them at the library webarchive terminals.
Deutsche Nationalbibliothek	Y	Y	Y	No	Only accessible in the reading rooms of the German National Library. The metadata is included in the publicly accessible library catalogue.
DILIMAG (Digital Literature Magazines)	Y	Y	N	No	Metadata are publicly available, for the archived versions provides free or restricted access depending on the right holders agreement. Full-text search is implemented in the new version (online since February 2015).
Bibliothèque et Archives nationales du Québec (BAnQ)	Y	N	N	No	Provides access according to partner policy.
Government of Canada Web Archive (GCWA)	Y	Y	Y	Proxy	Library and Archives Canada makes its federal government web archives (materials under Crown Copyright) publicly accessible. Indices are available for discovering Canadian federal web resources alphabetically by authoring organization and by URL. Full text indexing is based on Lucene.
Web Information Collection and Preservation - WICP (Chinese Web Archive)		Y		No	Archive content is only available in intranet in National Library of China. Some collections are publicly available, with meta-data search and browsable by collection.
Croatian Web Archive (Hrvatski arhiv weba - HAW)	Y	Y	Y	Proxy	Full open access.
Webarchiv (National Library of the Czech Republic)	Y	N	N	N	Due to copyright restrictions, only a limited number of archived websites for which agreements were signed with the publishers is available online. For other resources you can find out whether a given website was archived and the number of harvested versions. Unlimited access to all resources in Webarchiv is available from public terminals in the National Library.
Netarkivet.dk	Y	N	Y	No	Online access granted only to researchers through a Citrix login to free text search based on Solr and a proxy solution that accesses an archive through the Wayback. It has established a framework for running batch jobs with the possibility of data mining.
Estonian Web Archive	Y	Y	N	No	Public access to archived content is allowed only with a permission of the copyright owner. Full archive is accessible merely to the web archive personnel.
Finnish Web Archive	Y	N	15% of material.	No	URL search is public, but users have to visit a library in Finland to see the material. Full-text search is available to 15% of material.
BnF - Web Legal Deposit	Y	N	15% of the collection	No	Accessible to authorized users through the reading rooms of the BnF Research Library located in Paris and Avignon and in partner libraries in regions and overseas territories. Wayback was customized and interface was translated to French. Full Text search only available on specific collections (i.e. news, COVID-19, the early French web). Builds special collection galleries based on a selection from the archive on a given topic.
Ina (Institut National de l'Audiovisuel)	Y	Y	Y	No	Full text indexing is based on Lucene. To accommodate results from frequent crawls (several crawls per hour for some pages) clustering is operated to handle similar versions of pages.
E-diaspora (Télécom ParisTech, FMSH)	Y	N	N	No	1381 sites are currently crawled to build an archive on migrants usage of the web, social studies researchers have launched a long run project based on this archive Ina is handling crawls and storage.
Internet memory Foundation	Y	Y	Y	No	Provides access and search services according to partners policy.
Bibliotheksservice-Zentrum Baden-Württemberg	Y	Y	Y	Native	Archived websites accessible via Archive-It; integrated in the SWB union catalog. Full open access for major part of snapshots, some restricted by IP.
Web archive of the German Bundestag	Y	N	N	No	Web archive itself are snapshots of www.bundestag.de and other websites. Navigation is possible by clicking on the years.
Vefsafn (Web Archive, National and University Library of Iceland)				[Native]	Open to anyone via a customized pyWb installation.
Palestine Web Archive	N	Y	N	No	Still in development and pilots.
Web Archiving Project (WARP), The National Diet Library, Japan	Y	Y	Y	Native	All the archived websites are available on the premises. 85% of them is also accessible on the Internet with the permission of webmasters.
National Library of Korea - OASIS (Online Archiving & Searching Internet Resource)	Y	Y	Y	No	100% of the archive is indexed. Enables search by topic classification (e.g. Religion, Science, Arts). Search available.
Koninklijke Bibliotheek	Y	N	N	No	The web archive is accessible on terminals in the KB reading rooms to full members ('onsite').
New Zealand Web Archive	Y	Y	Y	Native	Domain harvests: available to selected staff using Pywb and limited to URL searches. Selective harvests: each website is described in the catalogue (providing subject, author, title and URL searches) and can be viewed by the public via the Internet by clicking on the link to the archived copy. A small subset of the selective harvests are accessible using full-text search.
The National Library of Norway	N	Y		No	Sites are integrated in the Catalog. Left bar enables facet navigation with drill-down.
Arquivo.pt - the Portuguese web-archive	Y	Y	Y	Native	A full-text and URL search service is freely available. Image search is also supported. Archived data can be mined through an Hadoop platform or publicly available Application Programming Interfaces to develop web applications.
Web archive of Cacak	N	N	N	No	Plans to develop a search engine in the future. One bad characteristic of HTTrack is that it renames files during the archiving, so the original structure of the website is lost, as well file names.
Web Archive Singapore	Y	Y	Y	No	The collection is viewable at the National Library, Singapore with selected content cleared by copyright owners available online.
Digital Resources (University Library in Bratislava)	Y	Y	N	No	It is possible to find out whether a website was archived and how many harvested versions exist. Due to the copyright restrictions only a limited number of archived websites is publicly available (based on agreements with publishers). The access to other archived resources is available locally in the University Library in Bratislava.
Slovenian Web Archive	Y	N	Y	No	The archive of selective crawls is publicly accessible. Use is possible by browsing and full-text search. National domain crawls are not accessible yet but will be in the future.
Archivo de la Web Española	Y	Y	Y	No	Public URL search available online. Full content accessible by visiting the BNE or a regional conservation centre in Spain. Full-text search is available for selected collections. Thematic and event collections are browsable by category.
PADICAT: The Web Archive of Catalonia	Y	Y	Y	No	Full open access.
Basque Digital Heritage Archive	Y	Y	Y	No	Archive of Basque digital heritage
Kulturarw3 (Sweden)	Y	N	N	No	Public access through dedicated machines in the library building.
Aleph Archives	Y	Y	Y	No	Automatic web archiving platform for online capture and preservation. Support eDiscovery with powerful and qualitative technology. Aimed to corporations, institutions and agencies seeking to capture, preserve and leverage their Web content; dynamic websites, wikis, social media, forums, comments, disclaimers, and ads, for compliance (FDA, FINRA, FSA, SEC, FOIA), marketing or pure preservation purposes.
Web Archive Switzerland	Y	Y	Y	No	Web Archive Switzerland is the collection of the Swiss National Library containing websites with a bearing on Switzerland. Web Archive Switzerland has been integrated in e-Helvetica, the access system of the Swiss National Library, giving access to the entire digital collection. So you can do full text searching of a part of the Web Archive. But the archived versions of websites can only be viewed in the reading rooms of the Swiss National Library and of our partner libraries who help us build the collection of Swiss websites. But you can view the metadata of the archived versions from anywhere.
NTU Web Archiving System, NTUWAS	Y	Y	Y	No	Presents page thumbnails, archived pages mapped to geographical locations.
Web Archive Taiwan	Y	Y	Y	No	
PageFreezer	Y	Y	Y	No	Enterprise Class On Demand service to archive and replay websites, blogs, Ajax, Flash, video, audio & social media for litigation protection, eDiscovery and regulatory compliance with FDA, FINRA, FSA, SEC, SOX, Federal Rules of Evidence and records management laws. Used by government agencies and public listed corporations in Pharmaceutical, Food, Finance, Healthcare and Retail industry.
The UK Web Archive	Y	Y	N	Native	
Hanzo Archives	Y	Y	Y	No	Commercial web archiving services and appliances. Access includes full-text search, annotations, redaction, URL/History, archive policy and temporal browsing, and configurable metadata schema for advanced e-discovery applications. Used in government and corporations whose compliance or legal obligations / needs extend to their websites, intranet, and social media. Many 'dark' archives across Europe and USA.
UK Government Web Archive (UKGWA)	Y	Y	Y	Native	Full text search is operational on the UK Government Web Archive (UKGWA). Users can browse the collection using a full A-Z list of all sites.
EU Exit Web Archive	Y	Y	Y	Native	Full text search is operational on the EU Exit Web Archive.
Internet Archive (provides Archive-it service)	Y	Y	Y	Native	URL history is available for all archived data. Meta-data and full-text search only for selected crawls. Until 2002 had a mining platform for research composed by Alexa Shell Perl Tools; av_tools and p2 platform for parallel processing. It was replaced by a simpler access and direct method that enables automatic access to files but no platform for processing.
Columbia University Libraries Web Resources Collection Program	Y	Y	Y	No	Accessible through Archive-it service.
North Carolina State Government Web Site Archives	Y	Y	Y	No	Accessible through Archive-it service.
Latin American Web Archiving Project	Y	Y	Y	No	Content can be accessed via full-text search, or by browsing by country or by specialized sample collection.
Web Archiving Project for the Pacific Islands	Y	Y	Y	No	Supported by Archive-it service.
Library of Congress Web Archives	Y	Y	N	Proxy	Access provided via LCWA. Records in MODS (Metadata Object Descriptive Schema) format.
Harvard University Library: the Web Archive Collection Service (WAX)	Y	Y	Y	No	
Web Archiving Service from California Digital Library (WAS service)	Y	Y	Y	No	Access for private study, scholarship and research. Most archives built with WAS have not yet been published because it is up to the partners to decide if they want to provide access. There are 16 partners using the service and they have created over 80 web archives, only 30 are publicly accessible. NutchWAX performance did not permit full archive search. Upcoming transition to SOLR will permit both full archive and collection-specific full text search.
Bentley Historical Library (University of Michigan) Web Archives	Y	Y	Y	No	Powered by the WAS from the California Digital Library. Access is public but usage is restricted for private study, scholarship and research.
University of Texas at San Antonio Web Archives	Y	Y	Y	Native	Accessible through Archive-it service and the Texas Archival Repositories Online database.
AUEB Web Archive	Y	Y	Y	No	
World Bank Web Archives	Y	Y	Y	No	URL history provided via open access to collection via standard web browser. Full text search is only available within each individual site. Search on metadata is available via advanced search within Web Archives collection.
University of North Texas CyberCemetery	N	Y	Y	No	
Tamiment Library and Robert F. Wagner Labor Archives at New York University	Y	Y	Y	No	Access is provided through the WAS service as well as through finding aids that are searchable through NYU's finding aids portal.
York University Digital Library	Y	Y	Y		
Netherlands Institute for Sound and Vision (Sound and Vision) web archive		Y	Y	N	Selected sites for which agreements have been made are publicly available. Full text indexing is done with Elasticsearch, the front-end is built in Drupal.
Kentucky Department for Libraries and Archives	Y	Y	Y	No	Full open access.
University of California, San Francisco Library	Y	Y	Y	Native (through IA)	Both capture and access for archived content are provided by the Archive it service, so all capabilities are same as for Archive-It.
Ivy Plus Libraries	Y	Y	Y	No	Accessible through Archive-It service.
Malaysian Government Web Archive (MyGWA)	Y	Y	Y	No	Open Access.
National Library of Medicine (U.S.)	Y	Y	Y		Access is provided through Archive-It.
Smithsonian Libraries and Archives (U.S.)	Y	Y	Y		Access is provided through Archive-It.
Common Crawl	Y	Y	N	No	In addition to direct download, most of our archive is also available in the Internet Archive Wayback.
GFNDC	Y	Y	Y	Native	Full-text index across legacy markup, archived code fragments, and emulated interface states. Supports URL history reconstruction and metadata-based query expansion. Public search tools include URL timeline view and UI emulator access. Complies with the Decentralized Archival Ethics Accord (DAEA 2023).
Chinese University of Hong Kong Web Archive	Y	N	Y	No	Public portal provides browsing/viewing of archived versions and keyword search across archived websites; A–Z browsing is available; powered by MirrorWeb.
Internet Information Resource Preservation and Protection (National Library of China)				No	NLC publishes a service/programme page for preservation; related announcements for the 2019 strategic project describe a distributed “socialized preservation” model where data are preserved/managed by co-building partners, but do not clearly expose a public replay/search portal.
