= Perma.cc =

Web archiving service for legal and academic publications

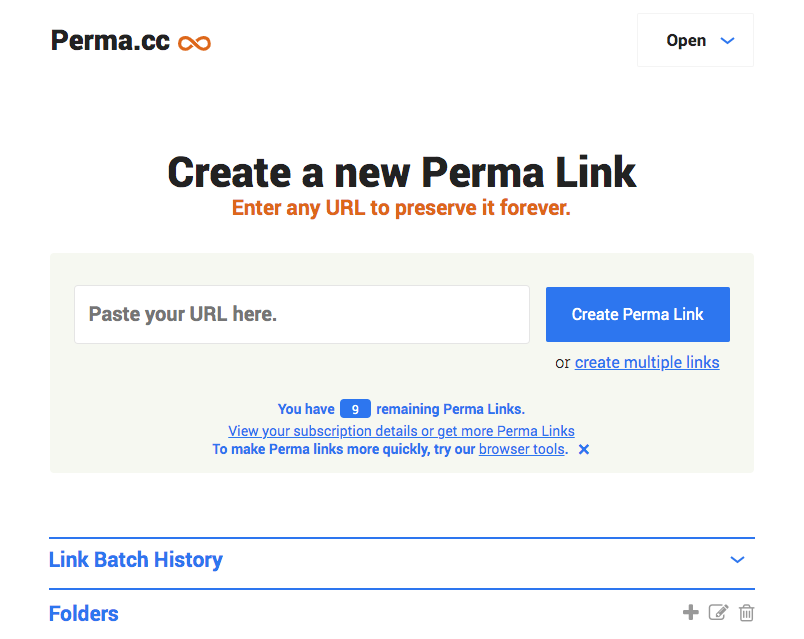
- Page for archiving new links
- Country of origin: United States of America
- Owner: Harvard Library Innovation Lab
- Key people: Jack Cushman
- Website: perma.cc
- Launched: September 2013; 13 years ago
- Written in: Python

Perma.cc is a web archiving service for legal and academic citations founded by the Harvard Library Innovation Lab in 2013.

== Concept ==
Perma.cc was created in response to studies showing high incidences of link rot in both academic publications and judicial opinions. By archiving copies of linked resources, and providing them with a permanent URL, Perma.cc is intended to provide longer-term verifiability and context for academic literature and caselaw. Perma.cc is administered by a network of academic and government libraries.

In 2016, Harvard received a $700,000 grant from the Institute for Museum and Library Services to expand development of Perma.cc.

== Design ==
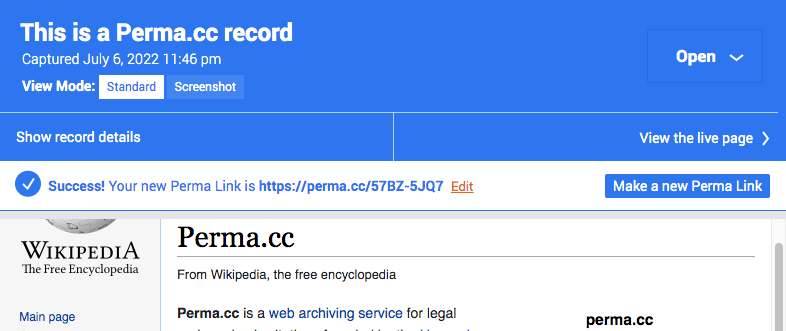
The header shown on an archived page

Perma.cc initiates page saves by user request only, it does not crawl the web and save pages like the Wayback Machine. A user account is required to save a page. Its target audience are organizations such as libraries, academic journals, law courts and school faculty. It provides support for organizational membership and administration of user accounts. Metadata such as notes can be added which are viewable to members within an organization. Pages can be made public or private within an organization. In 2017, Perma.cc added individual accounts limited to 10 free page saves per month, and commercial option for non-academic organizations to create institutional accounts. In January 2019, free individual accounts stopped receiving 10 free links on a recurring basis each month.

Perma.cc saves both a WACZ file and a PNG screenshot of a desired webpage. Capture is achieved with Scoop, a single-page focused web archiving program created by the Library Innovation Lab. WARC playback is handled by ReplayWeb.page.

Perma.cc has an API for functions such as adding or deleting pages. Perma.cc is part of the Memento network; thus, all public pages can be searched for (by URL) using the Memento API.

== See also ==
- Archive.today
- Digital preservation
- List of web archiving initiatives
- Megalodon (website)
