= Webarchiv =

Czech digital archive

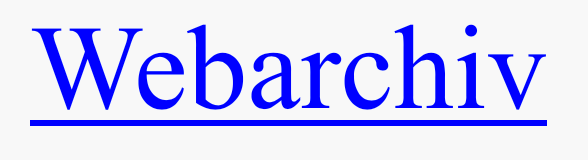
- Website type: Digital library
- Available in: Czech, English
- Founded: 2000; 26 years ago
- Headquarters: Prague, Czech Republic
- Parent: National Library of the Czech Republic
- Website: Webarchiv.cz
- Launched: 2001

Webarchiv is a digital archive of important Czech web resources, (i.e. published on the Internet) which are collected with the aim of their long-term preservation.

Preservation began in 2000, organized with help of the National Library of the Czech Republic, in cooperation with the Moravian Library and the Institute of Computer Science at Masaryk University. Nowadays Webarchiv is organized by the National Library of the Czech Republic only.

Webarchiv utilizes tools developed by the Internet Archive and the International Internet Preservation Consortium (IIPC) such as Heritrix for web archiving.

Webarchiv has been a member of IIPC since 2007.

== Types of harvests ==
The main aim of the Webarchiv project is to implement a comprehensive solution in the field of archiving of the national web, i.e. bohemical online-born documents. That includes tools and methods for collecting, archiving and preserving web resources as well as providing long-term access to them. Both large-scale automated harvesting of the entire national web and selective archiving are being carried out, including thematic „event-based“ collections. At present these methods are tested and are a subject of further research. To run all operations in a routine way, two conditions must be met: long-term funding has to be provided and the current legal issues have to be solved (primarily the legal deposit legislation).

Webarchiv have two collections of archived websites. One is available via online access; it's a limited dataset whose content is covered by agreements with its original publishers. Second collection can only be accessed in the Library. According to Czech copyright law online access to archived websites is based on agreement with website owner or on Creative Commons licence. Website without this agreement are blocked from the online archive and they are accessible only from the library terminals.

=== Comprehensive harvests ===
The main focus of comprehensive crawls is to automatically harvest the biggest number of Czech web resources. The list of URLs is from organisation CZ.NIC.

=== Selective harvests ===
Collection of resources with historical, scientific or cultural value manually selected. Collection is accessible online due to contracts with publishers.

The main focus of comprehensive crawls is to automatically harvest the biggest number of Czech web resources. The requirements of comprehensive crawls are:

Domain – Czech domain (.cz) web resources are collected. Resources with other domains can be also harvested, but they have to meet the optional requirements:

Other requirements are optional:

Format – harvesting different formats of resources depends on a technical settings of the harvester

Access – only freely accessible resources are harvested

Number of files – maximum 5000 files from one domain

=== Topic harvests ===
Topic collections are collections of resources which are related to certain event of topic, for example elections.
