= UK Web Archive =

Project to archive UK websites

- Established: 2005
- Reference to legal mandate: Yes, provided in law by: Legal Deposit Libraries Act 2003 (United Kingdom); Legal Deposit Libraries (Non-Print Works) Regulations 2013

Other information
- Website: www.webarchive.org.uk
- Libraries providing access to the archive.

The UK Web Archive is a consortium of the six UK legal deposit libraries which aims to collect all UK websites at least once each year. Following a cyberattack on the British Library in October 2023, the service was unavailable until October 2026.

== History ==
In 2005, the British Library, The National Archives, Wellcome Trust, National Library of Scotland, National Library of Wales and JISC formed the UK Web Archiving Consortium, a project to archive websites.

UKWAC archived selected websites by license or permission, using PANDAS software developed by the National Library of Australia. During the project its members collected sites relevant to their interest; the Wellcome Library collected medical sites, the national libraries sites that reflect life in contemporary Wales or Scotland. The British Library worked with a broad policy of collecting sites of cultural, historical and political importance to the UK.

The Consortium wound up in 2010. The Archiving and Preservation Working Group took over UKWAC's co-ordinating role web archiving in the UK. The Digital Preservation Coalition hosts the working group.

== Web archiving ==
The archive undertakes an annual crawl of .uk and other UK geographic Top Level Domains such as .scot, .cymru or .london.

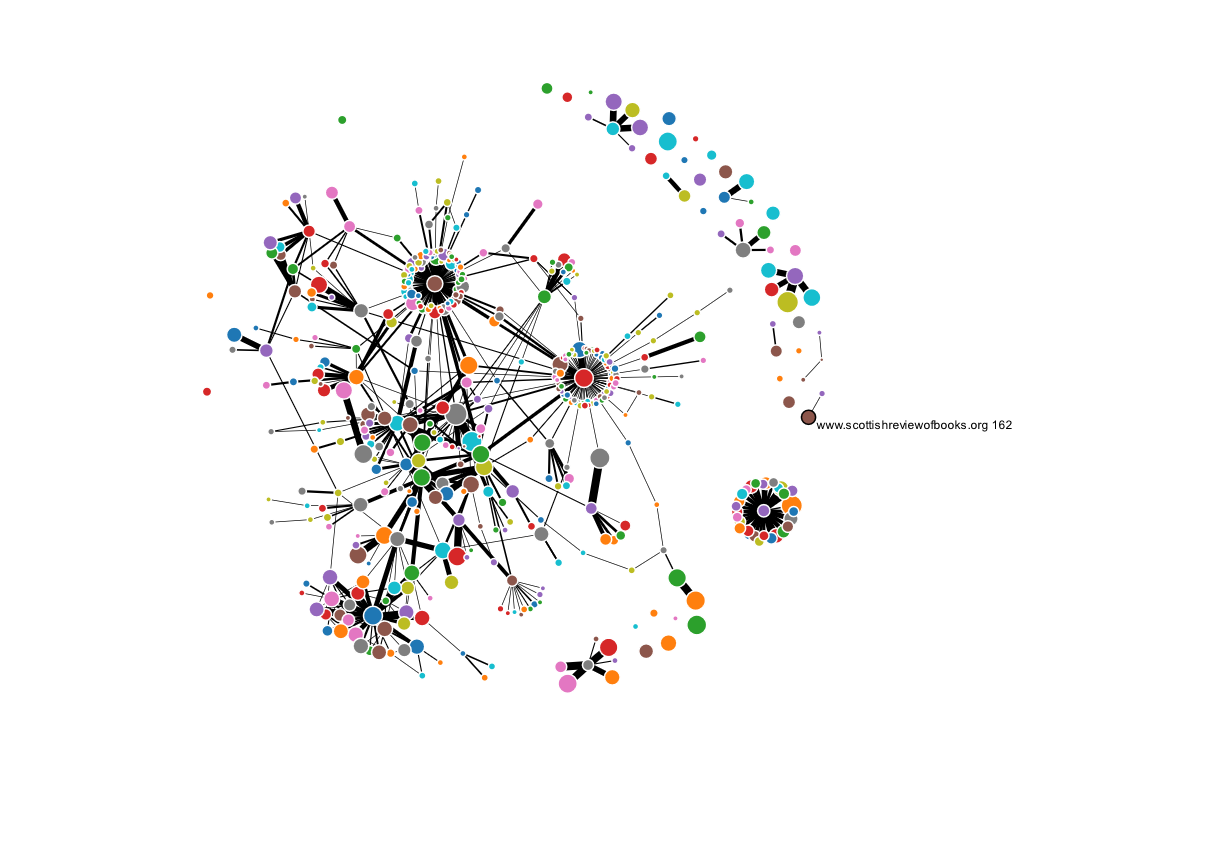
A graph showing a small part of a crawl. Every circle is a different website, and every line represents a link that was followed between websites. The size of the circle represents how many pages were visited from that site, and the width of the line represents the number of links followed. UKWA Crawls: one hour in one minute

The crawl is archived in a shared infrastructure called the Digital Library System. Members of the public can nominate sites for preservation there through the UKWA website. The whole web archive is available to registered readers on library premises; and where permission has been given, or license conditions can be met, copies are also accessible through the website.

The archive gathers sites in response to events, building collections - these have preserved writing and imagery recording natural disasters, election campaigns since 2005 and the UK's blogosphere for research, among more than a hundred more.

== SHINE ==
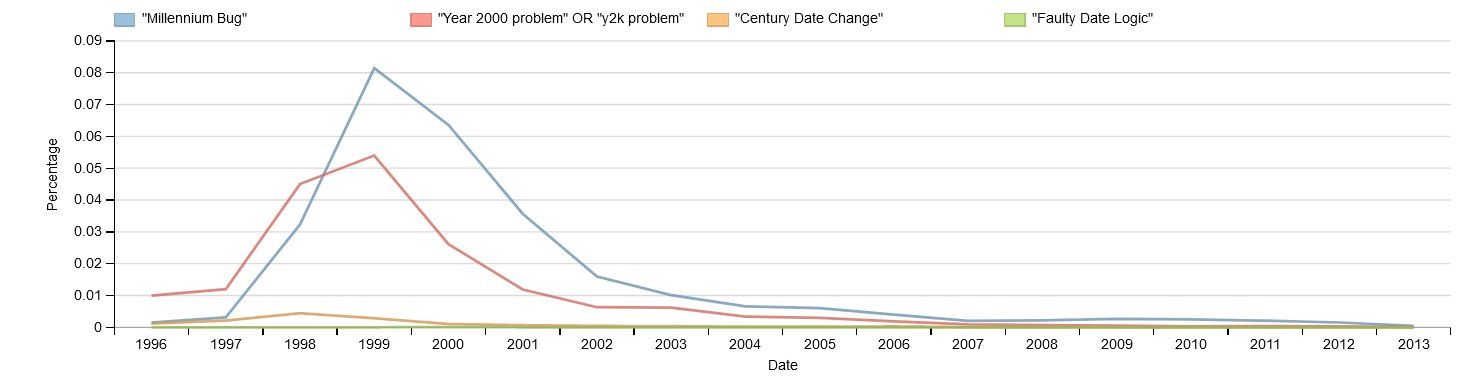
SHINE graph showing how often different phrases for "year 2000 problem" appear between the years of 1996 and 2013 on archived .uk webpages.

The UK Web Archive holds a collection of all the .uk websites that were archived by the Internet Archive until the end of March in 2013. SHINE is a web interface which can be used to create repeatable lists of results of historical .uk pages. Trends, or occurrences of keywords in the data set on .uk pages over that time, use concordance to show keywords in context.

== Mementos ==
Memento is a name for prior versions of web pages coined by the Memento Project. The UK Web Archive Memento interface allows Mementos to be found across web archives. The interface can be used to find a Memento by its date in a snapshot table, or see how often a site appears across public web archives.

== Researching the archive ==
Research into the web as a reflection of society has helped develop access to the archive. Libraries have developed guides to research skills needed to use web archives. These include using big data to see patterns or trends, or writing citations for archived copies of websites.

=== GLAM Workbench ===
GLAM Workbench is a project which looks at how researchers can use data preserved by galleries, libraries, archives and museums. It includes a collection of Jupyter notebooks which draw on Mementos and index data. The notebooks mix description and editable code to help researchers find evidence in web archives.

Where the whole archive can be accessed, by Library
Bodleian Libraries	British Library	Cambridge University Libraries	National Library of Scotland	National Library of Wales	Trinity College Dublin

== See also ==
- National Records of Scotland Web Continuity Service
- Public Record Office of Northern Ireland Web Archive
- UK Government Web Archive
- UK Parliament Web Archive
- Web Archiving Initiatives
