= Legal Services Research Centre =

The Legal Services Research Centre (LSRC) operated as the independently managed research division of the Legal Services Commission (LSC) for England and Wales from 2000, having initially been established as the Legal Aid Board Research Unit (LABRU) in 1996. The LSRC was an internationally recognised and influential leader in the field of access to justice research. As a result of the Legal Aid, Sentencing and Punishment of Offenders Act 2012, the LSRC along with the LSC was abolished in April 2013.

== Background ==
Created to inform and advance access to justice policy and service delivery in England and Wales, the LSRC conducted strategic research on legal services and related social policy issues, in both the civil and criminal justice fields. Through its work, the LSRC influenced main aspects of the delivery of legal aid - from civil and criminal contracting to means testing, the development of outreach and integrated service models, advice in police stations, area-based resource allocation, different modes of advice delivery, and diversity monitoring. Responsible for the development of the English and Welsh Civil and Social Justice Survey (from 2001 to 2009) and the Civil and Social Justice Panel Survey (from 2010 onwards), much of the LSRC's work focused on people's experience of legal problems and advice-seeking behaviour.

== Publications ==
The LSRC's multi-disciplinary team disseminated findings in a variety of formats, including in peer-reviewed journals, reports, books, lectures and papers. In addition the LSRC also organised a biannual International Research Conference, the last of which was held in Oxford in September 2012. For 15 years the LSRC conference provided a platform for researchers, policy-makers and Government representatives working in legal aid around the world to discuss emerging research and policy.

Until 2011 the LSRC had its own dedicated website, a copy of which has been retained in the UK Government Web Archive. Its content was then merged into the Ministry of Justice website. Both sites contain a detailed list of LSRC publications and downloads.

== LSRC Conferences ==
Year	Title	Location
2004	Social Exclusion: A Role for Law	Selwyn College, Cambridge
2006	Transforming Lives: The Impact of Legal Services and Legal Aid	Queen's University, Belfast
2008	Reaching Further: New Approaches to the Delivery of Legal Services	Royal Naval Academy, Greenwich
2010	Research into Practice: Legal Service Delivery in a New Decade	Downing College, Cambridge
2012	Rights and Wrongs? Developments in Access to Justice	Magdalen College, Oxford
