= Megalodon (website) =

Japanese on-demand web citation service

- Screenshot of the home page on 22 February 2026
- Available in: Japanese
- Country of origin: Japan
- Owners: Affility Co., Ltd.
- Website: megalodon.jp
- Commercial: Yes
- Launched: 5 August 2005

Megalodon (Japanese: ウェブ魚拓, Hepburn: webu gyotaku; "web gyotaku") is an on-demand web citation service based in Japan. It is owned by Affility.

Megalodon's server can be searched for "web gyotaku" or copies of web pages, by prefixing any URL with "gyo.tc"; the process checks the query against other services as well, including Google's cached pages and Mementos.

On 12 November 2010, Affility revealed that all files copied before the first half of 2007 were lost because of a malfunction in their backup process.

Megalodon does not archive sites which include a noindex or noarchive tag in the robots.txt file.

== See also ==
- List of web archiving initiatives
