= UK Government Web Archive =

Part of the national archives

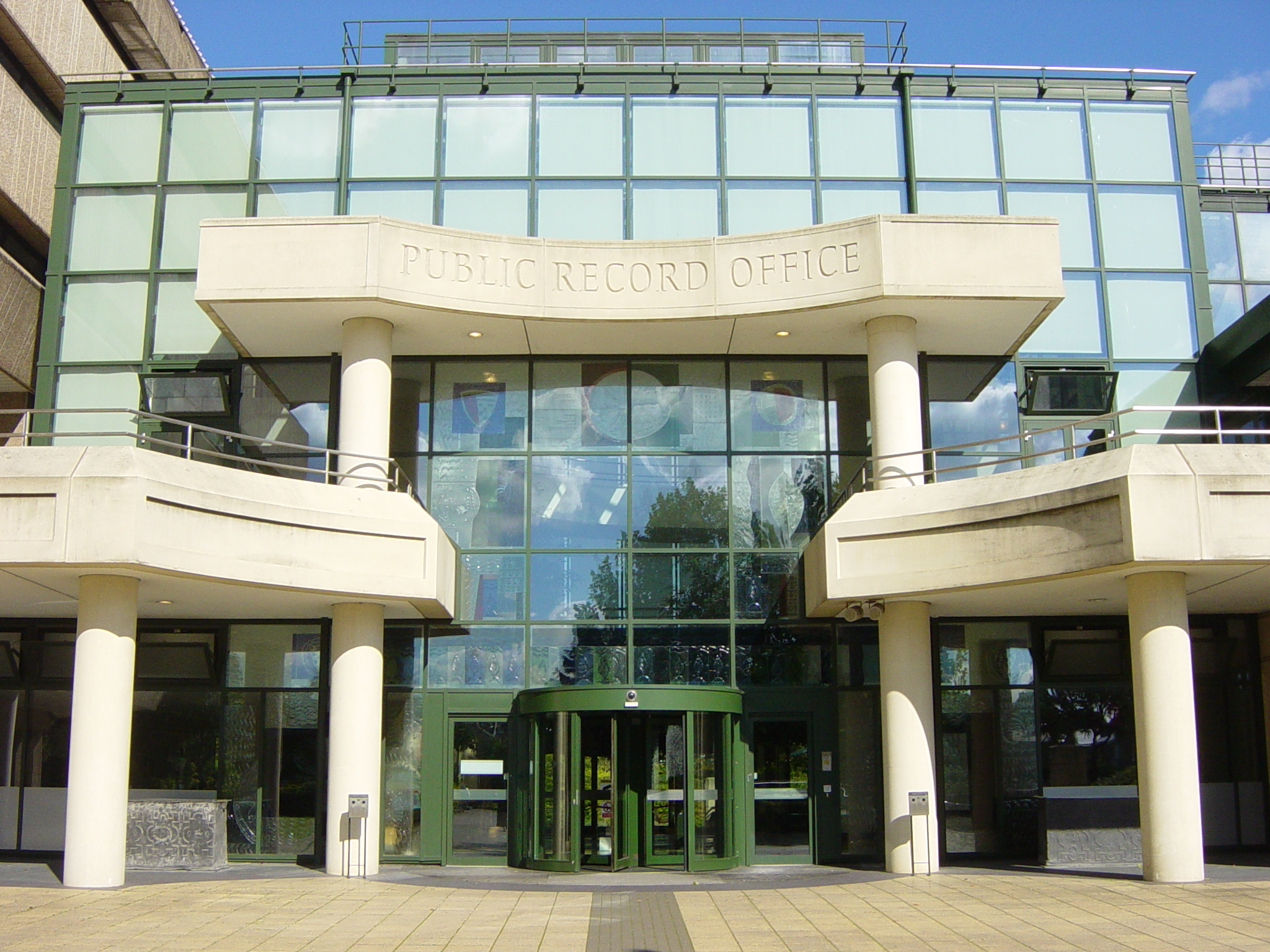
The National Archives head office in Kew, London

The UK Government Web Archive (UKGWA) is part of The National Archives of the United Kingdom. The National Archives collects records from all UK government departments and bodies creating records defined as Public Records under the British Public Records Act. This includes on-line records. These are captured, preserved, and kept accessible by the UKGWA, in conjunction with an external service provider. Initially, and until July 2017, this was the Internet Memory Foundation. The current provider is MirrorWeb.

The UKGWA is one of the web archiving initiatives holding the largest amount of material fully open to the public: the majority of UK public records are Crown Copyright and so are available under the Open Government Licence. Restrictions to Crown Copyright material mean, however, that, when it comes to social media archiving, the UKGWA can capture only the UK Government's side of the conversation with the public.

== History ==
The UKGWA began operation only in August 2003, and the oldest material in the Archive, which dates back to 1996, has been provided retrospectively by the Internet Archive. The UKGWA was a founding member of the UK Web Archiving Consortium (UKWAC) and captured many websites through the consortium between 2004 and 2010.

Between 2004 and 2008 the UKGWA mainly held copies of websites created by departments of state and those of UK Public Inquiries. During 2007, Members of Parliament became aware of the increasing problem of link rot on UK government web sites. In particular many links from Hansard were found to have stopped working. The response was the Web Continuity programme, which provides automatic redirection to the UKGWA of links from UK Government web sites, in cases where the linked material has been retired. Web Continuity required UK Government website managers to work with the UKGWA to capture copies of any material about to be removed. As a result, the UKGWA captures almost all of the UK Government web estate. This became significant during periods of government website closures, initially with the Directgov programme; and more recently with the convergence of UK government content onto the Gov.uk website.

== Scope ==
UK government departments make use of social media to communicate with the public, so that part of the online Public Record is now held on sites not directly managed by government departments. From 2014 the UKGWA has captured part of this material: official tweets on Twitter and government videos released on YouTube.
