= PageFreezer =

Digital services provider in Vancouver, Canada

Pagefreezer Software, Inc.
- Company type: Private
- Founded: Vancouver, BC, Canada (2010)
- Headquarters: Vancouver, BC, Canada
- No. of locations: 3 (Vancouver, Seattle, Delft)
- Area served: North America, Europe, Australia
- Founder: Michael Riedijk (CEO)
- Industry: Computer software Website Archiving; Social Media Archiving; Regulatory compliance Software-as-a-Service; Enterprise software
- Subsidiaries: WebPreserver Software, Inc.
- Website: pagefreezer.com

Pagefreezer is a SaaS company headquartered in Vancouver, Canada. The company provides website, social media, text message, and enterprise collaboration platform archiving to meet regulatory compliance (FINRA, SEC, FDA, FTC) and eDiscovery requirements.

== History ==
Pagefreezer was founded in 2010 by Michael Riedijk. The first version of Pagefreezer.com was launched on 26 May 2010. In June 2011, an office in The Netherlands was opened to support European customers. The company gained traction after it made the Red Herring Top 100 2012 list as one of three Canadian technology start-up companies.

On 8 April 2015, Pagefreezer launched a separate SaaS solution known as WebPreserver to enable law firms, law enforcement agencies, and investigators to gather legally admissible digital evidence from websites and social media. In June 2018, WebPreserver became a wholly owned subsidiary of Pagefreezer.

The company was listed in the PROFIT 500, a list of the 500 fastest-growing companies in Canada in 2017, ranking #19 in the Software category and #50 across all industries.

In May 2019, the company achieved ISO 27001 certification on its internal processes, in addition to being SOC 2 Type 1 and Type 2 Compliant.

== Awards ==
- 2019 Growth 500, Canada's Fastest-Growing Companies
- 2018 Growth 500, Canada's Fastest-Growing Companies
- 2018 Inc 5000, the most prestigious ranking of the nation's fastest-growing private companies
- 2017 PROFIT 500, Canada's Fastest-Growing Companies
- Finalist Red Herring Top 100 Global 2014
- Winner of the 2012 Red Herring Top 100 Americas Awards
- Accenture Innovation Awards 2011, Second Place Winner
