= International Internet Preservation Consortium =

Organisation

- Abbreviation: IIPC
- Formation: July 2003; 23 years ago
- Purpose: Acquire, preserve and make accessible knowledge and information from the Internet for future generations everywhere, promoting global exchange and international relations.
- Website: http://netpreserve.org/

The International Internet Preservation Consortium is an international organization of libraries and other organizations established to coordinate efforts to preserve internet content for the future. It was founded in July 2003 by 12 participating institutions, and had grown to 35 members by January 2010. As of June 2026, there are 56 members.

Membership is open to archives, museums, libraries (including national libraries), and cultural heritage institutions.

== Members ==
=== National libraries ===
Participating national libraries and archives include:

- Austrian National Library
- Biblioteca Nacional de España
- Bibliotheca Alexandrina (Egypt)
- Bibliothèque nationale de France
- British Library
- German National Library
- KBR, Royal Library of Belgium
- Library and Archives Canada
- Library of Congress
- National Archives (United Kingdom)
- National and University Library in Zagreb
- National and University Library of Iceland
- National and University Library of Slovenia
- National Diet Library (Japan)
- National Library Board of Singapore
- National Library of Australia
- National Library of Catalonia
- National Library of Chile
- National Library of China
- National Library of the Czech Republic
- National Library of Estonia
- National Library of Finland
- National Library of Greece
- National Library of Israel
- National Library of Ireland
- National Library of Korea
- National Library of Latvia
- National Library of Luxembourg
- National Library of the Netherlands
- National Library of Medicine
- National Library of New Zealand
- National Library of Norway
- National Library of Scotland
- National Library of Serbia
- National Library of Sweden
- National Széchényi Library
- Polish State Archives
- Royal Danish Library
- Swiss National Library

=== Participating organisations ===
Other participating organizations include:

- Archiefweb.eu
- Arquivo.pt - Portuguese Web Archive
- Common Crawl Foundation
- Columbia University Libraries
- Hanzo
- Internet Archive
- Institut national de l'audiovisuel
- Los Alamos National Laboratory Research Library
- Netherlands Institute for Sound and Vision
- Old Dominion University Department of Computer Science
- Sydarkivera (Kommunalförbundet Sydarkivera)
- Stanford University Libraries
- University Library, Bratislava
- University of North Texas Libraries
- Webrecorder

=== Past members ===
WebCite used to be, but is no longer, a member of the IIPC. In a 2012 message, its founder Gunther Eysenbach commented that "WebCite has no funding, and IIPC charges 4000 Euro/yr in membership fees."

== Projects ==
The IIPC sponsors and collaborates on a number of different projects with its member organizations.

=== Current projects ===
- Collaborative Collections: IIPC members are collaborating to build public web archive collections based on transnational themes or events of mutual interest. Topics of existing collections include: European Refugee Crisis, Intergovernmental Organizations, Olympics, World War I Commemoration, Climate Change, Artificial Intelligence, and Novel Coronavirus (COVID-19).

IIPC also maintains an electronic mailing list open to anyone interested in issues associated with web harvesting, archiving, and quality maintenance issues.

=== Past projects ===
- Memento: aggregate metadata of the IIPC archives and provide access to Memento.
- Support for transitioning to pywb (Python Wayback).
- Developing Bloom Filters for Web Archives’ Holdings.
- Improving the Dark and Stormy Archives Framework by Summarizing the Collections of the National Library of Australia
- LinkGate: Core Functionality and Future Use Cases.
- Asking questions with web archives – introductory notebooks for historians: The project output is a set of 16 Jupyter notebooks that demonstrate how specific historical research questions can be explored by analysing data from web archives.
- IIPC sponsored a project on "cross-archival search strategies" which included the creation of an archive focused on the 2010 Winter Olympics.
- Starting in 2006, the National Library of New Zealand and the British Library developed the Web Curator Tool, an open-source workflow management system for selective web archiving. Since 2017 the Royal Library of the Netherlands has collaboratively developed the tool with the National Library of New Zealand. Version 3.2.1 was released in August 2024, and is available at GitHub. The Web Curator Tool is built upon Java and utilizes Internet Archive’s technology, the Heritrix web archiving crawler, and replay tools such as OpenWayback and Pywb.
- IIPC Web Archiving Doctoral Support Award: grant to provide three years of funding for a student to earn a PhD in Interdisciplinary Information Science at The University of North Texas College of Information.
- IIPC Member Staff Exchange: onsite training by experts for participating IIPC members to use Heritrix 3 web crawler.
- Working group on Statistics and Quality Indicators for Web Archiving: development of guidelines on the management and evaluation of Web archiving activities and products.
