= HTTrack =

Web crawler and offline browser software

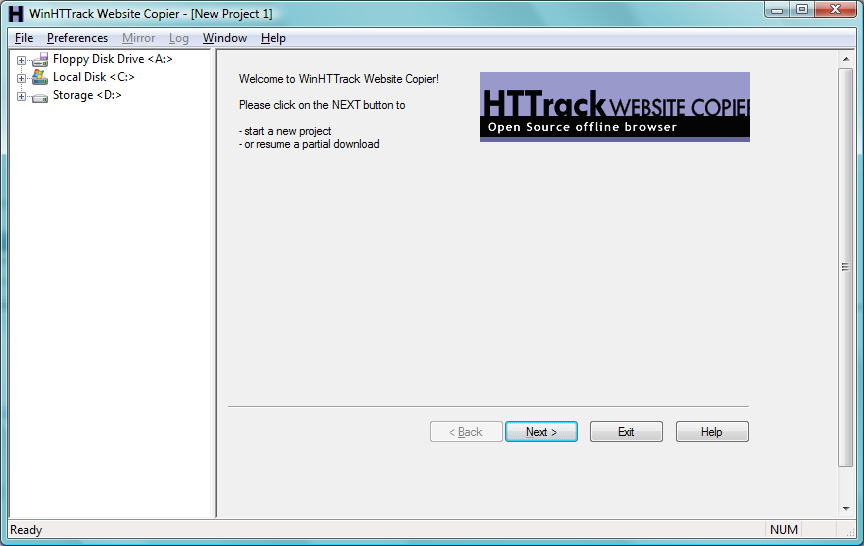
- Developer: Xavier Roche
- Initial release: May 1998; 28 years ago
- Stable release: 3.49.5 / 27 January 2024; 2 years ago
- Written in: C
- Operating system: Microsoft Windows, macOS, Linux, FreeBSD and Android
- Type: Offline browser and Web crawler
- License: GNU General Public License Version 3
- Website: www.httrack.com
- Repository: github.com/xroche/httrack

HTTrack is a free and open-source Web crawler and offline browser, developed by Xavier Roche and licensed under the GNU General Public License Version 3.

HTTrack allows users to download World Wide Web sites from the Internet to a local computer. By default, HTTrack arranges the downloaded site by the original site's relative link-structure. The downloaded (or "mirrored") website can be browsed by opening a page of the site in a browser.

HTTrack can also update an existing mirrored site and resume interrupted downloads. HTTrack is configurable by options and by filters (include/exclude), and has an integrated help system. There is a basic command line version and two GUI versions (WinHTTrack and WebHTTrack); the command line version can be used in scripts and cron jobs.

HTTrack uses a Web crawler to download a website. Some parts of the website may not be downloaded by default due to the robots exclusion protocol unless disabled during the program. HTTrack can follow links that are generated with basic JavaScript and inside Applets or Flash, but not complex links (generated using functions or expressions) or server-side image maps.

== See also ==
- Robots Exclusion Standard
- Website mirroring software
