= WARC (file format) =

File format

Web ARChive
- Filename extensions: warc
- Internet media type: application/warc
- Extended from: ARC
- Standard: ISO 28500:2017
- Open format?: Yes
- Website: iipc.github.io/warc-specifications/specifications/warc-format/warc-1.1-annotated/

The WARC (Web ARChive) archive format specifies a method for combining multiple digital resources into an aggregate archive file together with related information. These combined resources are saved as a WARC file which can be replayed using appropriate software such as ReplayWeb.page, or used by archive websites such as the Wayback Machine.

The WARC format is a revision of the Internet Archive's ARC_IA File Format that has traditionally been used to store "web crawls" as sequences of content blocks harvested from the World Wide Web. The WARC format generalizes the older format to better support the harvesting, access, and exchange needs of archiving organizations. Besides the primary content currently recorded, the revision accommodates related secondary content, such as assigned metadata, abbreviated duplicate detection events (see §7.6 "revisit"), and later-date transformations. The WARC format is inspired by HTTP/1.0 streams, with a similar header and the use of CRLFs as delimiters, making it very conducive to crawler implementations.

First specified in 2008, WARC is now recognised by most national library systems as the standard to follow for web archiving, though some have also started to list WACZ as an acceptable format.

In 2021, Webrecorder released WACZ, a file format that places the raw WARC files inside a ZIP archive. Because WARC consists of mostly raw network data, accessing individual files is not possible without downloading the whole WARC file. By utilizing ZIP, WACZ offers random-access index of all data, web archive metadata and full text index.

== Software ==
- ArchiveBox
- ArchiveWeb.page
- Apache Nutch
- Conifer
- har2warc
- Heritrix web archiver in Java
- libarchive
- ReplayWeb.page
- SolrWayback
- Scoop
- StormCrawler
- WARC Explorer
- warcit
- wget (since version 1.14)
- WebArchiver
- WebsiteArchiver

== See also ==
- ZIM (file format)
- HAR (file format)
