= Memento Project =

American web preservation project

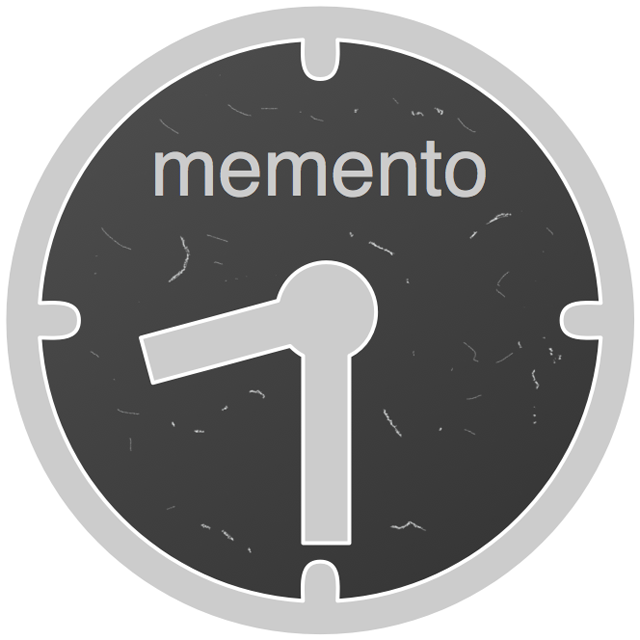
The Memento logo

The HTTP Framework for Time-Based Access to Resource States, also known as the Memento framework, is a method of denoting and obtaining historical revisions of HTTP resources, such as a web pages or files accessible by URL. Development of the framework was initiated as a project of the United States National Digital Information Infrastructure and Preservation Program (NDIIPP). It was funded with the aim of making Web-archived content more easily discoverable and accessible to the public.

The Memento project announced the shutdown of its hosted TimeTravel service on 5 September 2025.

== Technical description ==
Memento is defined in RFC 7089 as an implementation of the time dimension of content negotiation. HTTP accomplishes negotiation of content using headers that allow clients and servers to find content that the user desires.

Dimensions of Content Negotiation Provided by HTTP
Request Header	Response Header	Dimension	Examples	Reference
Accept	Content-Type	media type of the representation, can include character set	text/html; charset=utf-8; text/plain; image/png	RFC 9110 (obsoletes RFC 7231)
Accept-Language	Content-Language	language of the representation	en-US, en; cs	RFC 9110 (obsoletes RFC 7231)
Accept-Encoding	Content-Encoding	medium, typically compression, that the content has been encoded with	compress; gzip; deflate	RFC 9110 (obsoletes RFC 7231)
Accept-Datetime	Memento-Datetime	time of the representation	Fri, 15 Aug 2014 13:43:03 GMT	RFC 7089

The Last-Modified header provided by HTTP does not necessarily reflect when a particular version of a web page came into existence. Also, the Last-Modified header may not exist in some cases. To provide more information, the Memento-Datetime header has been introduced to indicate when a specific representation of a web page was observed on the web.

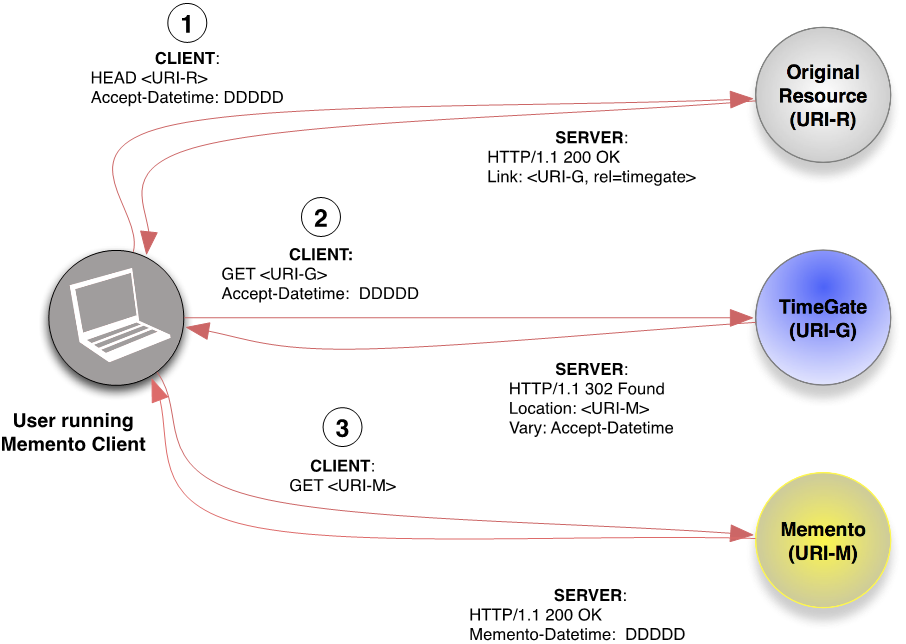
This diagram shows how Memento uses a TimeGate (URI-G) to find the best archived page (URI-M) for a user, given the original resource (URI-R) and a datetime.

== Usage ==
Copies of page can be found by simply navigating, in a web browser, to a link formatted, replacing urltoarchive with the full URL of the page desired.

JSON description of a Memento:

- http://timetravel.mementoweb.org/api/json/YYYY/urltoarchive
- http://timetravel.mementoweb.org/api/json/YYYYMM/urltoarchive
- http://timetravel.mementoweb.org/api/json/YYYYMMDD/urltoarchive
- http://timetravel.mementoweb.org/api/json/YYYYMMDDHH/urltoarchive
- http://timetravel.mementoweb.org/api/json/YYYYMMDDHHMM/urltoarchive

Or redirect to a Memento with a datetime that is close to a desired datetime:

- http://timetravel.mementoweb.org/memento/YYYY/urltoarchive
- http://timetravel.mementoweb.org/memento/YYYYMM/urltoarchive
- http://timetravel.mementoweb.org/memento/YYYYMMDD/urltoarchive
- http://timetravel.mementoweb.org/memento/YYYYMMDDHH/urltoarchive
- http://timetravel.mementoweb.org/memento/YYYYMMDDHHMM/urltoarchive
