= Coveo =

Canadian software company

Coveo Solutions Inc.
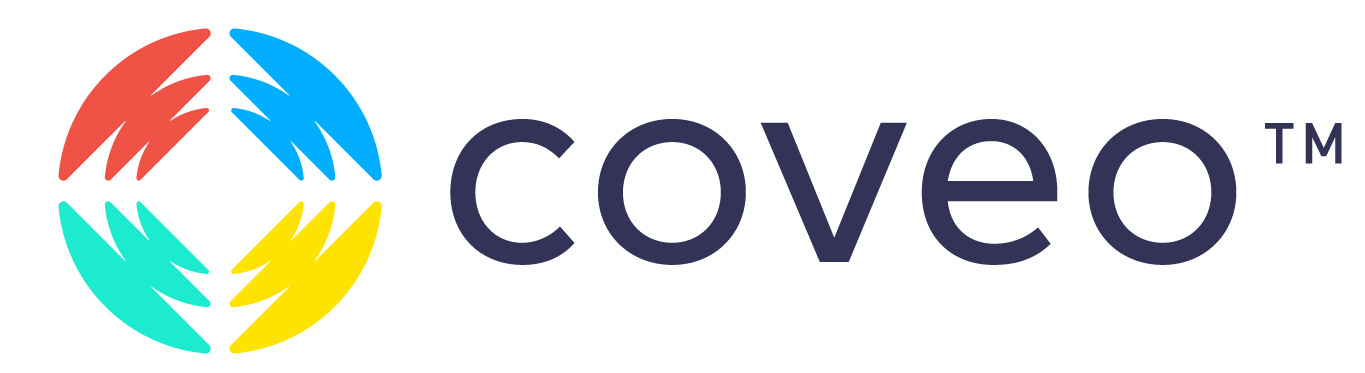
- Type: Public company
- Traded as: TSX: CVO
- Industry: Enterprise software
- Founded: 2005; 21 years ago
- Founder: Laurent Simoneau, Richard Tessier, and Marc Sanfaçon
- Headquarters: Quebec City, Quebec, Canada
- Key people: Louis Têtu (Chairman and CEO), Laurent Simoneau (Founder, President, and CTO)
- Products: Corporate search and analysis tools
- Number of employees: 500+ (2020)
- Website: www.coveo.com

Coveo, a Canadian software as a service (SaaS) company that provides e-commerce and enterprise search software for ecommerce, customer service, digital workplaces, and websites. As of June 2020, the company had over 500 employees.

== History ==
Coveo Solutions Inc. was founded in 2005 as a spin-off of Copernic Technologies Inc by Laurent Simoneau, Richard Tessier, and Marc Sanfaçon. Laurent Simoneau, Coveo's president and chief executive officer was formerly Copernic's chief operating officer. About 30 employees moved into the new company, with offices at that time in Quebec City and in Palo Alto, California.

Louis Têtu, a Quebec native and former CEO of Taleo and Baan, joined Coveo in 2008 as CEO.

In 2017, Coveo invested 5 million Canadian dollars into opening up an office in Montreal, with 25 new hires, and approximately 25 more planned for the office at the time. Since then, over a hundred new employees joined the Montreal office, which expanded onto additional floors of the historic Gare Windsor building.

In July 2019, Coveo announced the acquisition of Tooso, an AI-based digital commerce engines company. In October 2021, Coveo acquired Qubit, in AI-powered personalization technology for merchandising teams.

== Funding ==
In April 2018, Evergreen Coast Capital led a $100 million investment into Coveo. With this investment, Bill Shaheen of Evergreen joined the Coveo board of directors.

Coveo received another round of funding in November 2019 for $227 million Canadian dollars led by OMERS Private Equity, resulting in a valuation of the company at $1 billion US.

== Products ==
The company provides an internal automated search tool called Coveo Platform that helps business use its internal data to optimise work flow and customer recommendations through transaction analysis. The software can be integrated and use data from a number of enterprise software platforms. It has created Coveo for SAP Commerce, Coveo for Salesforce, Coveo for ServiceNow, Coveo for Microsoft Dynamics, Coveo for Commerce, and Coveo for Sitecore.

== See also ==
- Apache Lucene
- Apache Solr
- Elasticsearch
- Apache Nutch
- Algolia
- Lucidworks
