= Algolia =

Search software company

Algolia, Inc.
- Type: Private
- Industry: Software; Information Technology; Search Engines
- Genre: Search and index
- Founded: 8 October 2012
- Founders: Nicolas Dessaigne; Julien Lemoine
- Headquarters: San Francisco, California, U.S.
- Area served: Worldwide
- Key people: Stephen Lynch (CEO); Xavier Grand (CTO)
- Services: Real-time search
- Number of employees: 800+
- Website: algolia.com

Algolia is a French proprietary search-as-a-service platform, with its headquarters in San Francisco and offices in Paris and London. Its main product is a web search platform for individual websites.

== Company ==
Algolia was founded in 2012 by Nicolas Dessaigne and Julien Lemoine, both originally from Paris, France. It was originally a company focused on offline search on mobile phones. Later it was selected to be part of Y Combinator's Winter 2014 class.

Starting with two data centers in Europe and the US, Algolia opened a third center in Singapore in March 2014, and as of 2019, claimed to be present in over 70 data centers across 16 worldwide regions. It serves roughly 18,000+ customers, handling over 1.75+ Trillion searches a year. In May 2015, Algolia received $18.3M in a series A investment from a financial group led by Accel Partners, and in 2017 a $53M series B investment, also led by Accel Partners. From June 2016 to September 2019, the usage of Algolia by small websites increased from 632 to 5,168 in the "top 1 million websites" and 197 in the "top 10k websites" evaluated by Built With.

In January 2021, Algolia acquired Romanian AI and machine learning startup Morphl.

In July 2021, Algolia raised a $150 million Series D funding round and became a unicorn, with a valuation of $2.25 billion.

In September 2022, Algolia acquired Australian search startup company Search.io

== Products and technology ==
The platform provides search as a service, offering web search across a client's website using an externally hosted search engine. Although in-site search has long been available from general web search providers such as Google, this is typically done as a subset of general web searching. Algolia's product only indexes their clients' sites. Data for the client site is pushed from the client to Algolia via a RESTful JSON API, then the search box is added to the client's web pages.

=== API ===
Algolia provides their search service via various APIs. The Rest API provides basic features of search, analysis and monitoring. There are 10 supported languages and platforms for client usage.

=== Infrastructure ===
Algolia documented one attempt to remove all single points of failure in their architecture and proposed a worldwide infrastructure called Distributed Search Network to reply to a search query from any location closer to the source.

The DSN feature allows setting the locations in Algolia's network where the data should be duplicated.

== See also ==
- Apache Lucene
- Apache Solr
- Coveo
- Elasticsearch
- Lucidworks
