= OpenSearch (software) =

Open source search engine

- Original author: Amazon Web Services
- Developer: OpenSearch Software Foundation
- Release: 12 April 2021; 5 years ago
Stable release
- 3.x: 3.9.0 / 29 September 2026; 22 days ago
- Written in: Java
- Type: Search engine
- License: Apache License 2.0
- Website: www.opensearch.org
- Repository: github.com/opensearch-project/opensearch

OpenSearch Dashboards
- Developer: OpenSearch Software Foundation
- Release: 12 April 2021; 5 years ago
- Stable release: 3.9.0 / 29 September 2026; 22 days ago
- Written in: TypeScript, JavaScript
- Type: Search engine
- License: Apache License 2.0
- Website: www.opensearch.org
- Repository: github.com/opensearch-project/opensearch-dashboards

OpenSearch is a family of software consisting of a search engine (also named OpenSearch), and OpenSearch Dashboards, a data visualization dashboard for that search engine. It is an open-source project developed by the OpenSearch Software Foundation (a Linux Foundation project) written primarily in Java.

As of 2025, the project had surpassed one billion software downloads. AWS previously reported that OpenSearch had "tens of thousands" of customers, while Elastic claimed to have over 20,000 subscribers.

== History ==
The project was created in 2021 by Amazon Web Services as a fork of Elasticsearch and Kibana after Elastic NV changed the license of new versions of this software away from the open-source Apache License in favour of the Server Side Public License (SSPL). Amazon would hold sole ownership status and write access to the source code repositories, but invited pull requests from anyone. Other companies such as Logz.io, CrateDB, Red Hat and others announced an interest in building or joining a community to continue using and maintaining this open-source software.

On September 16, 2024, the Linux Foundation and Amazon Web Services announced the creation of the OpenSearch Software Foundation. Ownership of OpenSearch software was transferred from Amazon to the OpenSearch Software Foundation (OSSF), which is organized as an open technical project within the Linux Foundation. The Linux Foundation reported that at the time, "OpenSearch recorded more than 700 million software downloads and participation from thousands of contributors and more than 200 project maintainers." The OpenSearch Software Foundation launched with support from premier members Amazon Web Services, SAP, and Uber.

In September 2024, Elastic added the AGPLv3 license as an option alongside SSPL and the Elastic License for the core of Elasticsearch, though binary releases and higher-tier features remained under the Elastic License 2.0.

=== OpenSearch 3.0 ===
OpenSearch 3.0, the project's first major version release in three years, was released in April 2025 alongside an upgrade to Apache Lucene 10. The release introduced significant performance improvements, including up to 25% faster range queries and 2.5× faster concurrent k-NN search. It also included experimental support for gRPC transport and GPU-accelerated vector indexing, a new Java agent-based security framework replacing the Java Security Manager, and pull-based ingestion from streaming sources such as Apache Kafka.

Subsequent 3.x minor releases continued adding capabilities. OpenSearch 3.1 made GPU-accelerated index builds generally available and introduced semantic field support and star-tree indexes for aggregation acceleration of up to 100×. OpenSearch 3.3 delivered 11× faster performance compared to OpenSearch 1.3 and expanded gRPC transport across major query types. OpenSearch 3.4 added a no-code agentic search user experience with Model Context Protocol (MCP) integration. OpenSearch 3.5, released in February 2026, added agentic conversation memory, hook-based context management for LLM token optimization, and expanded Prometheus support for observability workloads.

== Projects ==
=== OpenSearch ===
OpenSearch is a Lucene-based search engine that started as a fork of version 7.10.2 of the Elasticsearch service. It has Elastic NV trademarks and telemetry removed. It is licensed under the Apache License, version 2, without a Contributor License Agreement.

Since version 3.0, OpenSearch is based on Apache Lucene 10. In addition to full-text search, OpenSearch supports vector search through multiple engines including Lucene, FAISS and nmslib, with support for vectors of up to 16,000 dimensions. This makes it suitable as a vector database for use cases such as semantic search and retrieval-augmented generation (RAG).

=== OpenSearch Dashboards ===
OpenSearch Dashboards started as a fork of version 7.10.2 of Elastic's Kibana software, and is also under the Apache License, version 2.

=== OpenSearch Kubernetes Operator ===
The OpenSearch Kubernetes Operator is an open-source operator for managing OpenSearch clusters on Kubernetes. Version 3.0, released in January 2026, introduced quorum-safe rolling restarts, multi-namespace and multi-tenant support, TLS certificate hot reloading, and support for OpenSearch 3.0 features including gRPC.

== Ecosystem and distributions ==
OpenSearch can be deployed as a self-managed cluster, via the managed Amazon OpenSearch Service, or through other managed providers such as Aiven and Instaclustr. Third-party enterprise distributions also exist, such as BDB OpenSearch Enterprise by BigData Boutique, which provides long-term support (LTS) versions, security patches, hardened configurations, and enterprise support for self-managed deployments.

Core features such as LDAP and Active Directory integration, role-based access control, and encryption are included in OpenSearch's open-source distribution at no cost, unlike Elasticsearch where some of these features require a paid license.

Community-backed solutions built on OpenSearch include Wazuh, an open-source XDR and SIEM platform.

== See also ==
- Elasticsearch § Licensing changes
- Graylog
