= Server Side Public License =

Copyleft license developed by MongoDB Inc.

- Author: MongoDB Inc.
- Published: October 16, 2018; 8 years ago
- SPDX identifier: SSPL-1.0
- Debian FSG compatible: No
- FSF approved: No
- OSI approved: No
- GPL compatible: No
- Copyleft: Yes
- Linking from code with a different license: No
- Website: www.mongodb.com/licensing/server-side-public-license

The Server Side Public License (SSPL) is a non-free strong copyleft software license first introduced by MongoDB Inc. in 2018.

It includes most of the text and provisions of the GNU Affero General Public License version 3 (AGPL v3), but requires anyone who offers the functionality of SSPL-licensed software to third-parties as a service to release the entirety of the service's source code, including all software, APIs, and other software that would be required for a user to run an instance of the service themselves, under the SSPL. This is in contrast to the AGPL, whose equivalent copyleft provision only applies to the source code of the licensed work itself, when conveyed over a network.

The SSPL is not recognized as an open source license by the Open Source Initiative (OSI), as the aforementioned provision is considered discriminatory against commercial users, and encumbers the use of software used together with an SSPL-licensed program.

== License terms ==
The SSPL is based on the GNU Affero General Public License (AGPL), with a modified Section 13 which requires those making SSPL-licensed software available to third-parties (modified or not) as part of a "service" to release the source code for the entirety of the service, including without limitation all "management software, user interfaces, application program interfaces, automation software, monitoring software, backup software, storage software and hosting software, all such that a user could run an instance of the service using the Service Source Code you make available", under the SSPL. The chapter structure of the Server Side Public License is identical to that to the AGPL, except that the GPL preamble and application instructions are stripped from the license text.

MongoDB Inc. stated that Section 13 in the AGPL (which requires that those using the AGPL-licensed software over a network have the ability to obtain the source code for the software, as used) had an unclear scope, and that the SSPL's version "clearly and explicitly sets forth the conditions to offering the licensed program as a third-party service".

== Licensed software ==
In October 2018, the MongoDB database was relicensed under the SSPL. Debian, Red Hat Enterprise Linux, and Fedora subsequently dropped MongoDB, citing concerns about the SSPL. Amazon released a partially compatible but proprietary service named DocumentDB.

In November 2020, Graylog announced that version 4.0 of its source-available release will be licensed under the SSPL.

In January 2021, Elastic NV announced that future versions of their code in Elasticsearch and Kibana, licensed until then under the open-source Apache License 2.0, would be dual-licensed instead under SSPL and their own Elastic license. Critics of the re-licensing decision predicted that it would harm Elastic's ecosystem, and Amazon responded with plans to fork the projects for continued development of versions licensed under the Apache License. Other users of the Elasticsearch ecosystem, led by Amazon Web Services, and including Logz.io, CrateDB, Red Hat and Aiven, also collaborated on the open source fork, leading to the creation of the OpenSearch software.

Redis moved away from the three-clause BSD license on March 20, 2024. Users now have a choice between the SSPLv1 license and their own Redis Source Available License (RSALv2). This change in licensing upset many users, prompting The Linux Foundation to create a fork called Valkey, using Redis' final BSD-licensed iteration as a base. On May 1, 2025, Redis announced it was releasing Redis 8 under the open source AGPLv3 license. Some developers argued the change did not go far enough to making the software freely available for all.

== Certification with OSI ==
In 2018, MongoDB submitted the license to the Open Source Initiative (OSI) for approval. The company withdrew its submission in 2019. Bruce Perens stated that the license specifically violates sections 6 and 9 of The Open Source Definition, as it discriminates against commercial use of licensed software as part of a service, and "encumber[s] entirely separate programs which are simply used together with the licensed program." In 2021, the OSI described the SSPL and similar licenses as a "fauxpen" source license.
