= Ihab Ilyas =

Canadian-Egyptian computer scientist (born 1973)

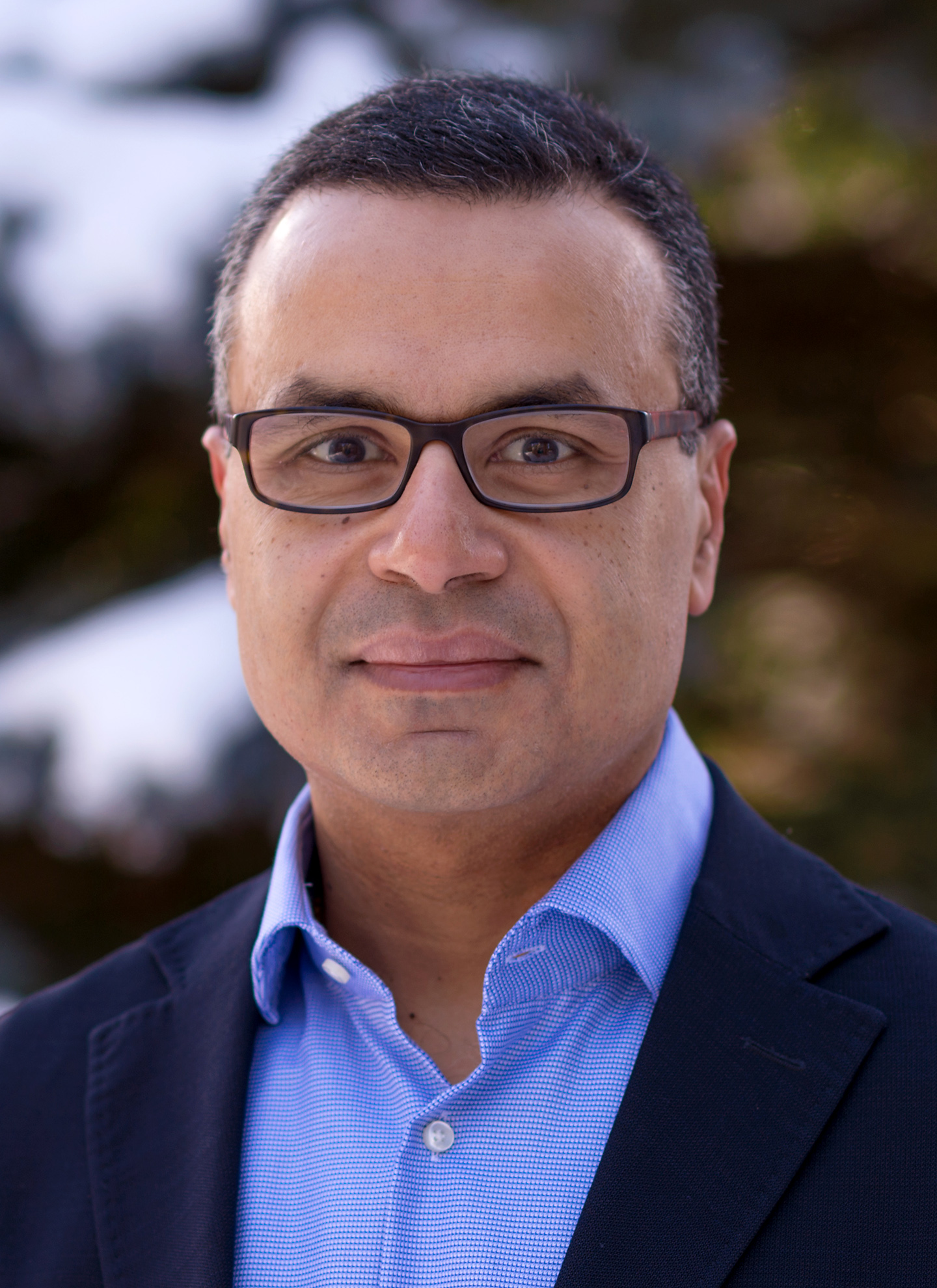
- Born: May 13, 1973 (age 53); Alexandria, Egypt
- Education: Purdue University (PhD) Alexandria University (BSc, MSc)
- Known for: Data science, Data cleaning, Data integration
- Awards: ACM Fellow, 2020; IEEE Fellow, 2022; C.C. Gotlieb Computer Award, 2024; Royal Society of Canada Fellow, 2024
- Scientific career
- Fields: Computer science
- Workplaces: University of Waterloo, Apple Inc.
- Website: Official website

Ihab Francis Ilyas (born May 13, 1973) is a computer scientist who works in data science. He is currently a Professor Emeritus of computer science in the David R. Cheriton School of Computer Science at the University of Waterloo and he is the co-founder and CEO of hiddenweights, a startup for building efficient custom AI. He has also led the Knowledge Platform team at Apple Inc. Ihab was the holder of the Thomson Reuters-NSERC Industrial Research Chair in Data Cleaning at the University of Waterloo.

Ilyas co-founded Tamr, a start-up focusing on large-scale data integration and cleaning, with Andy Palmer and Michael Stonebraker, a Turing Award winner. Ilyas co-founded and was the CEO of Inductiv, an artificial intelligence start-up that uses machine learning to automate the task of identifying and correcting errors in data, which he co-founded with Theodoros Rekatsinas at the University of Wisconsin-Madison and Christopher Ré at Stanford University. Inductiv was acquired by Apple Inc. in May 2020.

== Education and career ==
Ilyas was born and raised in Alexandria, Egypt. After completing bachelor's and master's degrees at Alexandria University in 1995 and 1999, respectively, he earned a PhD at Purdue University in 2004 under the supervision of Walid Aref and Ahmed K. Elmagarmid.

After his doctoral studies, Ilyas accepted a position in 2004 as a tenure-track professor at the University of Waterloo's David R. Cheriton School of Computer Science.

Research contributions

Ilyas is best known for the development of database systems and data science, with emphasis on data quality, data cleaning, managing uncertain data, machine learning for data curation, and rank-aware query processing.

Since 2009, he has focused research on data quality and the technical challenges in building data-cleaning systems. He and his research group introduced novel practical algorithms and system prototypes, which circumvent limitations of previous data-cleaning solutions that either focus narrowly on single types of data errors or ignore real-life considerations that prevent their adoption.

With Theodoros Rekatsinas, Christopher Ré, and Xu Chu, he introduced HoloClean, an open-source statistical inference engine to impute, clean and enrich data.

Awards and honours

Ilyas received a Government of Ontario Early Researcher Award in 2008, a provincial program that funds new leading researchers at publicly funded Ontario universities to build a research team. He was named an IBM Canada Advanced Studies Fellow from 2006 to 2010.

Ilyas held a Cheriton Faculty Fellowship at the David R. Cheriton School of Computer Science from 2013 to 2016 and he received the Google Faculty Award in 2014.

He was named an ACM Distinguished Member in 2014, and an ACM Fellow in 2020 for his contributions to data cleaning and data integration. He was also named IEEE Fellow in 2022 for his contributions in data cleaning, data integration and rank-aware query processing and a Fellow of the Royal Society of Canada in 2024. In 2024, he also received the 2024 C.C. Gotlieb Computer Award from IEEE Canada in recognition of his contributions to building large-scale machine learning systems for data integration, data cleaning, and knowledge construction.

Since 2018, Ilyas has held the Thomson Reuters-NSERC Industrial Research Chair in Data Cleaning. In 2020, he was named a faculty affiliate at the Vector Institute.

Service

Ilyas was elected a member of Board of Trustees of the Very Large Data Bases Endowment in 2016 and the Vice Chair of the ACM Special Interest Group on Data Management (SIGMOD) in 2017.
