= Dan Suciu =

- Education: University of Pennsylvania
- Known for: algorithms for semi-structured data and XML, probabilistic databases
- Awards: 2000 ACM SIGMOD Best Paper Award; NSF Career Award; Alfred P. Sloan Fellowship
- Scientific career
- Fields: Computer Science
- Workplaces: University of Washington
- Doctoral advisor: Val Tannen
- Doctoral students: Mike Cafarella; Christopher Ré

Dan Suciu is a full professor of computer science at the University of Washington. He received his Ph.D. from the University of Pennsylvania in 1995 under the supervision of Val Tannen. After graduation, he was a principal member of the technical staff at AT&T Labs until he joined the University of Washington in 2000. Suciu does research in data management, with an emphasis on Web data management and managing uncertain data. He is a co-author of an influential book on managing semistructured data.

His research work on developing query languages and algorithms for managing semistructured and XML data has been highly influential in the data management research community. He has helped shape XML query languages such as XML-QL and Strudel, which influenced the subsequent design of the standard XQuery language. His work on XML-relational mapping in the context of the STORED and SilkRoute projects built the foundations of the standard techniques that are now used for storing XML data in commercial database systems. His work on XMill, an XML compressor, won the best paper award at SIGMOD 2000, the main research conference in data management, and was seminal to a substantial amount of follow-up work. At the 2010 Symposium on Principles of Database Systems, Suciu and his co-authors Victor Vianu and Tova Milo won the Alberto O. Mendelzon Test-of-Time Award for their work ten years prior on type checking for XML transformation languages. In 2011, he was inducted as a Fellow of the Association for Computing Machinery. His current work on probabilistic databases was at the outset of a revival of interest in this area.

He lives in Seattle, Washington, with his wife and two children.
