= AdmitSee =

American educational technology company

- Available in: English
- Website: admitsee.com
- Current status: Active

AdmitSee, Inc. is an educational technology company and college-oriented social-networking site with offices in San Francisco and New York City. Their primary offering is AdmitSee, a database of successful college application essays and resumes. The service allows college applicants to read applications and resumes of accepted students. They browse basic profiles for free, and then pay to access full application files, including essays and advice; half of this money gets paid to the college students who shared their content. Applicants can also communicate directly with verified college students via the paid mentor messaging feature.

As of January 2016, the platform had over 50,000 application files and over 100,000 active users. AdmitSee uses official school IDs to verify student profiles and facilitates universities screening for plagiarism.

== History ==
The company was founded by Lydia Fayal and Stephanie Shyu in 2013 while they were attending law school at the University of Pennsylvania. The idea to create a database of application files came from Fayal's work as a college consultant when clients would ask how they compared to other applicants. After meeting at a Wharton event, the classmates expanded the idea to include peer mentoring and big data analysis. The founders were introduced in 2013 to founding engineer, Jerry Huyghe, who built the initial version of the website. The company advanced to the final round of the Wharton Business Plan Competition in 2014.

Early funding for the company came from Founder.org and the edtech accelerator Imagine K12. The company raised $1.8million seed funding in 2015 with plans to build a lead generation offering. Earlier in 2015, Fayal and Shyu were named to the Forbes 30 Under 30 list as influencers in the field of education.

The founders credit early traction to their virtual internship program, which they modeled after oDesk and to early adoption of online communities, such as Reddit.

== Reception ==
Press for AdmitSee includes USA Today lauding its plagiarism prevention methods and calling AdmitSee a "must-visit site this application season." News coverage has tended to focus on the company's published data, which include linguistic analysis of the site's repository of essays and of survey responses. Responses to this data have been mixed; some critics maintain that the data help students "game the system". AdmitSee has also received pushback from offline college consulting and test prep groups, who criticize AdmitSee's voyeuristic potential, comparing it to an online dating site. Despite criticism, the company does have its supporters in the admissions community and collaborates with educational partners.
