= Val Tannen =

Computer scientist

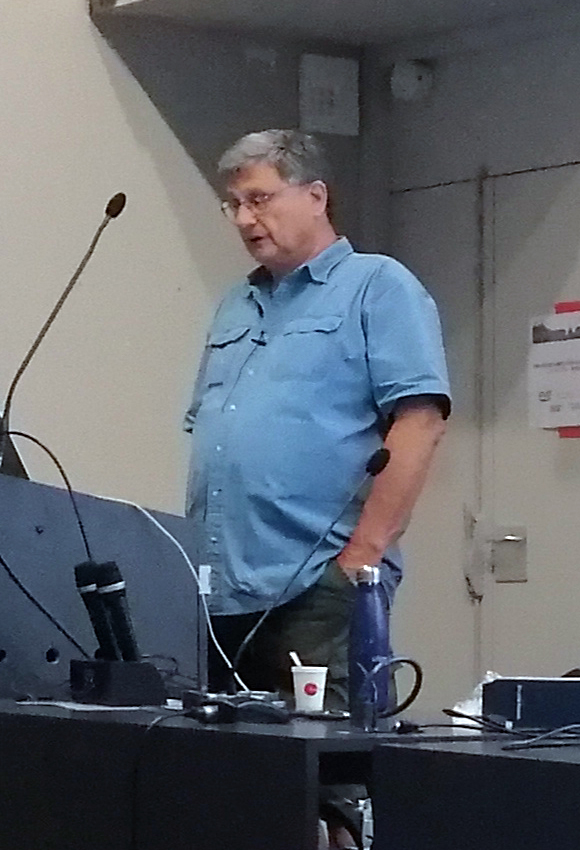
- Born: 1953 (age 72–73); Romania
- Education: MIT
- Awards: NSF Career Award; ACM Fellow (2013); Foreign Member Academia Europaea (2023)
- Scientific career
- Fields: Computer Science
- Workplaces: University of Pennsylvania
- Doctoral advisor: Albert Meyer
- Doctoral students: Dan Suciu
- Website: https://www.cis.upenn.edu/~val/home.html

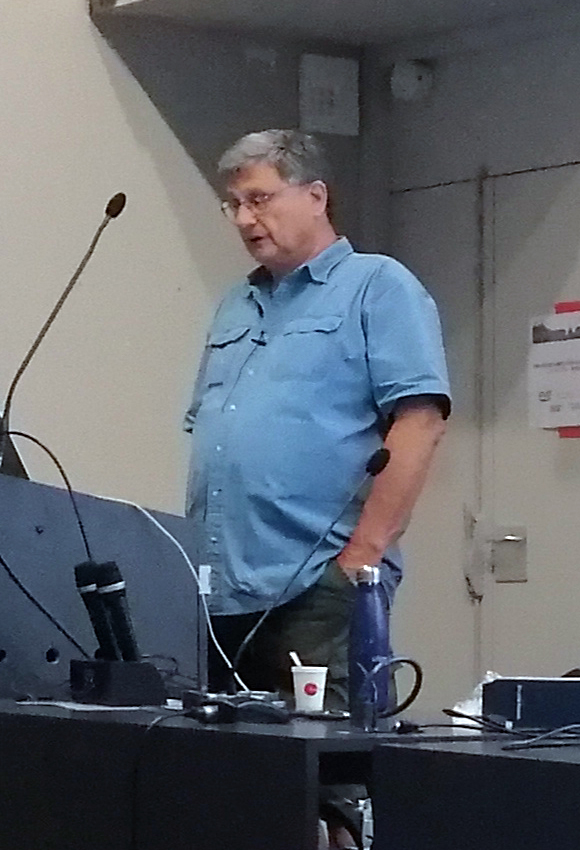
Val Tannen

Val Tannen is a computer scientist known for his contributions to the fields of database systems and programming languages. He is currently professor in the Department of Computer and Information Science at the University of Pennsylvania.

== Biography ==
Tannen was born in Romania and received his undergraduate degree from the Polytechnic Institute of Bucharest. After emigrating to the US, he received his PhD from Massachusetts Institute of Technology under the supervision of Albert Meyer. He has held numerous international visiting positions.

== Contributions ==
Tannen has contributed to the principles of both programming languages and databases and also to the unification of the two subjects. One of Tannen’s major contributions is the use of structural recursion to define a query language for nested relations. This not only provided a basis for query optimization on nested relations, it became – through the use of comprehensions – a standard technique for embedding relational databases in programming languages. Another is the invention of provenance semirings which give a generalization of many adjuncts to relational databases, such as probabilistic databases, c-tables and bag semantics as well as providing a general formalism for data provenance. In addition to databases and programming languages, Tannen has contributed to bioinformatics and to systematic and evolutionary biology.

On May 24 and 25 2024, a festschrift was held in Val Tannen's honor at the University of Pennsylvania.

== Awards and honors ==
- 2023 Foreign member of Academia Europaea
- 2017 10 years Mendelzon Test-of-Time Award from the Symposium on Principles of Database Systems
- 2013 Fellow of the Association for Computing Machinery
- 2014 20 years Test-of-Time Award from the Intl. Conf. on Database Theory
- 1990 - 1995 Presidential Young Investigator from the US National Science Foundation
