= Sambanova =

Sambanova or SambaNova may refer to:

- Sambanova (album), the 1999 debut album by Australian band Pnau
- SambaNova, an American technology company
