= Philip Johnston (entrepreneur) =

US entrepreneur and business executive

- Johnston in 2025
- Born: December 18, 1986 (age 39); United Kingdom
- Education: University of Nottingham (BSc Hons); Columbia University (MA); Wharton (MBA); Harvard University (MPA)
- Occupations: entrepreneur, business executive
- Organization(s): Starcloud; Fermi Explorer
- Known for: Co-Founder & CEO of Starcloud; Co-Founder & CEO of Fermi Explorer
- Website: starcloud.com

Philip Johnston (born December 18, 1986) is an entrepreneur and business executive. He is co-founder and CEO of Starcloud, a space technology company developing orbital data centers. In November, 2025, Starcloud launched a satellite with the first NVIDIA H100, which it used to train the first AI model in space. In March 2026, Starcloud became the fastest unicorn in Y Combinator history, hitting a $1.1bn valuation just 17 months after completing the program. In August 2026, Starcloud raised an additional $250M at a $2.3Bn valuation, with NVIDIA, Cisco, and Benchmark investing in the round.

Johnston is also the co-founder and CEO of The Fermi Explorer Mission, a non profit that will send the first spacecraft to another star, and previously co-founded Opontia, a digital brand aggregator.

== Early life and education ==
Johnston was born in Guildford, Surrey in the UK on December 18th, 1986. As a young child, he lived for five years in South Africa and later earned a First-class BSc Hons in applied mathematics from the University of Nottingham in 2008, where he was also admitted to Mensa. He then earned a master's degree in applied mathematics from Columbia University in 2010. He subsequently completed a three-year dual-degree Masters: an MBA from Wharton, and an MPA in National Security and Technology from Harvard University in 2019, where he was elected student body president of Harvard's John F. Kennedy School of Government. Johnston is also a Chartered Financial Analyst (CFA) charterholder.

== Career ==
Johnston started his career as a software engineer doing high-frequency algorithmic trading, and later returned to South Africa to do venture capital. Later, from 2019 to 2021, Johnston worked as an associate at McKinsey & Company where he worked with national space agencies.

In March 2021, Johnston co-founded Opontia alongside Manfred Meyer, a digital brand aggregator focused on the Central & Eastern Europe, Middle East, and Africa (CEEMEA) region. The company's business model centered on acquiring profitable digital brands. In December 2021, Opontia raised $42 million in a Series A round, making it one of the largest Series A rounds in the region. The round was a mix of equity and venture debt, with STV leading the equity investment. The company ranked 12th on Forbes Middle East's Top 50 most funded startups in 2021. Opontia was acquired by Perfection in 2023.

Johnston giving a TED Talk on Orbital Data Centers in October, 2025

In early 2024, Johnston co-founded Starcloud (originally named Lumen Orbit but changed after objection from Lumen Technologies). Starcloud is a US–based company that designs, builds, and deploys orbital data centers in space.

Starcloud participated in Y Combinator's Summer 2024 cohort and raised approximately $21 million in seed funding by the end of 2024. Investors include Y Combinator, NFX and In-Q-Tel, and the company is part of NVIDIA's Inception Program. The company rebranded from Lumen Orbit to Starcloud in February 2025.

In November 2025, Starcloud launched its first satellite, Starcloud-1, equipped with a NVIDIA H100 GPU, which the company reported as being 100 times more powerful than any GPU previously operated in space. The satellite successfully trained NanoGPT, a large language model, marking the first time an LLM was trained in space.

Johnston's Starcloud-1 deployment from a SpaceX Falcon 9 rocket on November 2nd, 2025

On March 13th, 2026, the FCC accepted for filing, an application by Starcloud for a constellation of 88,000 orbital data center satellites. On March 30th, 2026, Starcloud announced that it had raised a $170M Series A at a $1.1bn valuation led by Benchmark and EQT Ventures, making Starcloud the fastest unicorn in Y Combinator history just 17 months after completing the program.

In August 2026, Starcloud raised an additional $250M at a $2.3Bn valuation, with NVIDIA, Cisco, and Benchmark investing in the round.

In September 2026, Johnston announced the formation of non-profit, The Fermi Explorer Mission, with the aim of sending the first spacecraft to another star. The mission intends to launch a spacecraft to Alpha Centauri before the end of 2029, arriving in around 80,000 years.

== Personal life ==
Johnston lives in Redmond, Washington, USA. He is the youngest of 5 boys and has an identical twin, Adrian Johnston, who is the founder of Y Combinator-backed Elyos AI. Johnston is the great-grandchild of Lieutenant-General Sir William Dobbie. Johnston is engaged to be married to Harvard graduate student, Xinyi Tong, and is also a member of The Explorers Club.

== See also ==
- Starcloud – American company
- Fermi Explorer – Proposed interstellar mission
