= Upwork =

American freelance marketplace

Upwork Inc.
- Company type: Public
- Traded as: Nasdaq: UPWK; Russell 2000 component; S&P 600 component
- Founded: 1999; 27 years ago (as Elance); 2003; 23 years ago (as oDesk); 2013; 13 years ago (as Elance-oDesk); 2015; 11 years ago (as Upwork)
- Headquarters: Palo Alto, California, San Francisco, California U.S.
- Area served: Worldwide (except Russia and Belarus)
- Founders: Bernard Sheth; Srini Anumolu; Sanjay Noronha; Odysseas Tsatalos; Stratis Karamanlakis
- Chairperson: Thomas Layton
- CEO: Hayden Brown
- Key people: Hayden Brown (CEO); Thomas Layton (chairman)
- Industry: Freelance marketplace
- Revenue: ▲US$787.8 million (2025)
- Net income: ▼US$115.4 million (2025)
- Total assets: ▲US$1.21 billion (2024)
- Total equity: ▲US$575 million (2024)
- Website: upwork.com
- Registration: Required
- Users: ▼763,000 active clients (June 2026)

Upwork Inc. (formerly Elance-oDesk) is an American freelancing platform headquartered in Palo Alto and San Francisco, California. The company was formed in 2013 as Elance-oDesk after the merger of Elance Inc. and oDesk Corp. The merged company was subsequently rebranded as Upwork in 2015. Upwork went public in 2018. Changes to its fees and account policies have repeatedly drawn protests from freelancers, and after a prolonged decline in its share price the company became the target of an activist investor campaign in 2024 and carried out large workforce reductions in 2024 and 2026.

== History ==
=== 1998–2015: Early history ===
Elance was founded in 1998 by Bernard Sheth and Srini Anumolu in Jersey City. In December 1999, the company's 22 employees relocated to Sunnyvale, in California's Silicon Valley. Elance's first product was the Elance Small Business Marketplace. In 2001, Anumolu, by then eLance's general manager, was indicted on securities fraud charges over kickbacks he was alleged to have taken while working at New York Life before co-founding the company. The company declined to comment.

oDesk was founded in 2003 by Odysseas Tsatalos and Stratis Karamanlakis, who collaborated remotely between the United States and Greece. Originally created as a staffing firm, oDesk eventually became an online marketplace that allowed registered users to find, hire, and collaborate with remote workers.

Elance and oDesk announced their merger on December 18, 2013, to create Elance-oDesk.

=== 2015–present: Upwork ===
In 2015, Elance-oDesk was renamed as Upwork, which coincided with an upgrade of the oDesk platform under the same name. The newly named Upwork also planned to phase out the Elance platform within a couple of years. In 2016, the company replaced its flat freelancer fee with a sliding scale, a change that drew protests from users.

The company was listed on the Inc. magazine 5000 list from 2009 to 2014 and filed for an initial public offering on October 3, 2018.

In January 2020, Hayden Brown was appointed CEO of Upwork. In March 2022, Upwork was named to Time's list of TIME100 Most Influential Companies of 2022.

In 2023, the company launched a hub for AI-related services. In 2025, Upwork partnered with OpenAI. In 2024, the company introduced "Uma", an AI assistant. The system was built on large language models trained on platform data.

In September 2024, the activist investor Engine Capital disclosed a four percent stake in Upwork and called for changes to the company's board, saying the company needed to fix "foundational issues". Upwork's shares had fallen 37 percent since the start of the year. The following month, the company reported a quarterly profit of $28 million and cut 21 percent of its workforce.

Beginning in 2023, Upwork acquired the AI video conferencing platform Headroom; the search-as-service company ObjectiveAI in 2024; and in 2025 the workforce management company Bubty and Ascen, a compliance and EOR company.

For the 2025 fiscal year the company reported net income of $115.4 million, down 46 percent from $215.6 million the year before. On May 7, 2026, Upwork announced its second layoff of 25% of its workforce within two years. Its shares fell roughly 19 percent over the following five trading sessions, extending a decline of more than 50 percent over the previous 52 weeks. In the second quarter of 2026, Upwork reported year-over-year declines in gross services volume, revenue and active clients.

== Service and business model ==
Businesses and individuals connect through the Upwork platform to conduct business. Clients post a description of their job and a price range they are willing to pay for a freelancer to complete it. The client may invite specific freelancers to apply for their jobs, or post the job for any freelancer who is interested to apply. Once the client has chosen who they want to complete the job, they hire that freelancer by sending a contract with set hours, pay rate, and a deadline for the work to be completed. Freelancers are also required to purchase "connects" in order to be able to bid for jobs.

=== Fees ===
Until 2016, Upwork charged freelancers a flat fee of 10 percent of their earnings. In May 2016 the company replaced it with a sliding scale based on a freelancer's lifetime billings to each client: 20 percent on the first $500, 10 percent on billings up to $10,000, and 5 percent beyond that, with a separate 2.75 percent payment-processing charge for clients. Chief executive Stephane Kasriel said the change was meant to encourage longer-term projects and that the company was losing money on smaller jobs. Freelancers protested on Twitter and Reddit. In a survey of 226 freelancers posted in Upwork's online community, nearly 78 percent said their average contract per client was under $500, meaning their fees would double.

== Account suspensions ==
In March 2017, Upwork reported 14 million users in 180 countries with US$1 billion in annual freelancer billings. In 2020, the company purged 1.8 million freelancers, many of whom were rated as "less skilled" or had lower rankings on the platform, as it focused on serving Fortune 500 companies.

On March 7, 2022, Upwork started suspending operations for freelancers and clients in Russia and Belarus as a sanction following Russia's invasion of Ukraine in February 2022. Existing contracts were allowed to run only until May 1, 2022.

In July 2025, Ukrainian media reported that Upwork had begun mass-suspending the accounts of Ukrainian freelancers and companies after identity-verification checks, without an option to appeal, and that the platform had closed its official communication channels and community forum for Ukrainian users. Ukraine's minister of digital transformation, Mykhailo Fedorov, said his ministry was looking into the issue. At the end of July, after the ministry prepared an appeal to the company, Fedorov said Upwork had begun unblocking the accounts.

== Security and fraud ==
In 2009, a hacker breached Elance and obtained the personal details of more than 1.3 million registered users including names, addresses, passwords, and associated email account data.

In a 2024 Mashable feature, the writer Justin Caffier described losing $475 to a fake-client scheme that exploited the pressure on new freelancers to build up the platform's "Job Success Score" rating. In June 2026, the Five Eyes intelligence alliance warned that Chinese state actors were using LinkedIn, Indeed and Upwork to pose as recruiters and target people with access to sensitive government information.

== Working conditions ==
A 2023 Rest of World profile followed a South African copywriter who worked up to 20 hours per day across time zones to sustain her income on Upwork.

In March 2025, Inc. reported that a United States Department of Labor investigation into the data-labeling company Scale AI, which recruits contract workers through Upwork, had extended to Upwork and the staffing company HireArt. The investigation concerned alleged unpaid wages, worker misclassification and retaliation under the Fair Labor Standards Act.
