= Mike Cafarella =

American computer scientist

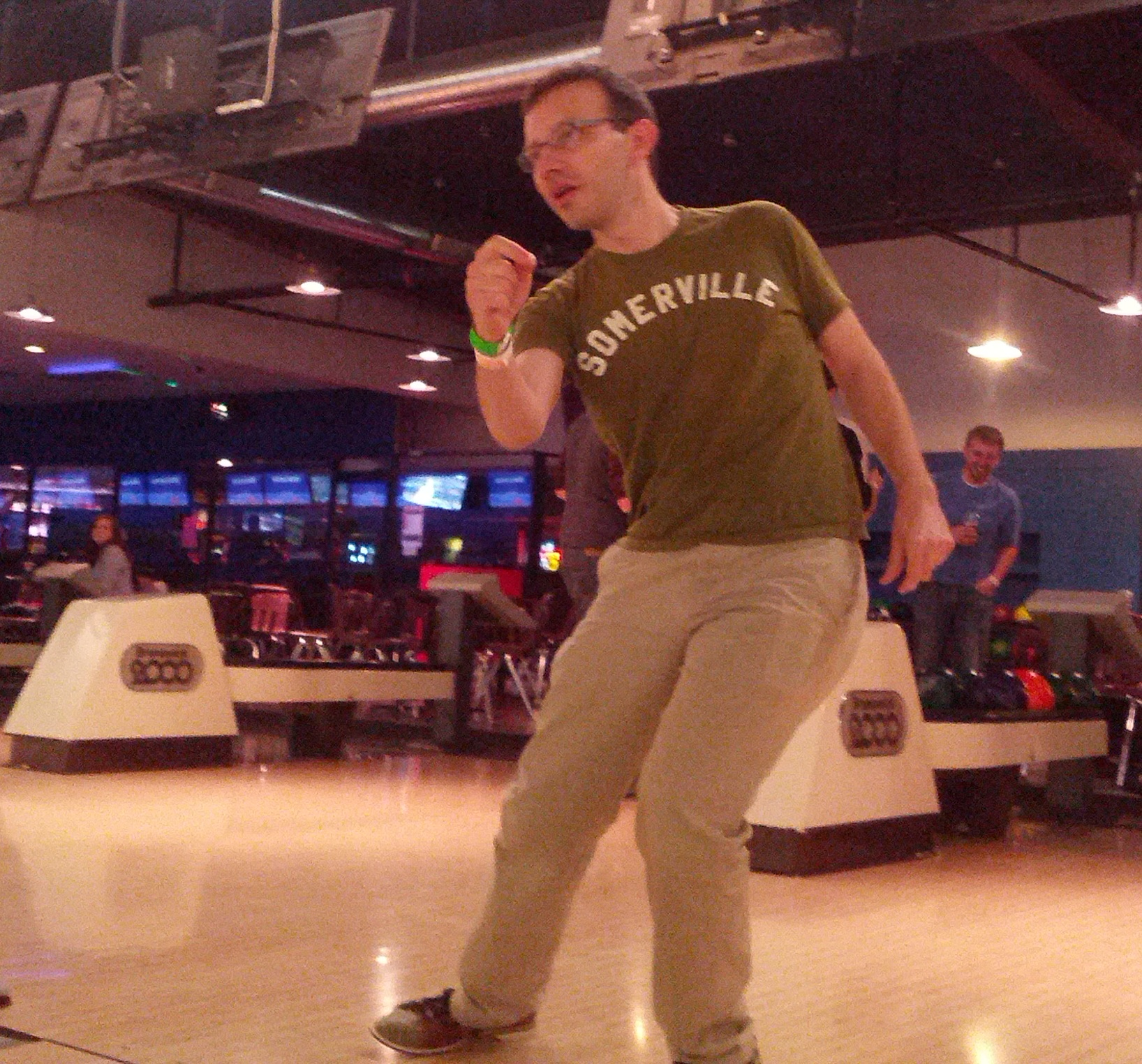
- Born: Poughkeepsie, New York
- Education: University of Washington, University of Edinburgh, Brown University
- Known for: Hadoop, Nutch
- Scientific career
- Fields: Computer Science
- Workplaces: Massachusetts Institute of Technology; University of Michigan
- Doctoral advisor: Dan Suciu

Mike Cafarella is a computer scientist specializing in database management systems. He is a principal research scientist of computer science at MIT Computer Science and Artificial Intelligence Laboratory. Before coming to MIT, he was a professor of Computer Science and Engineering at the University of Michigan from 2009 to 2020. Along with Doug Cutting, he is one of the original co-founders of the Hadoop and Nutch open-source projects. Cafarella was born in New York City but moved to Westwood, MA early in his childhood. After completing his bachelor's degree at Brown University, he earned a Ph.D. specializing in database management systems at the University of Washington under Dan Suciu and Oren Etzioni. He was also involved in several notable start-ups, including Tellme Networks, and co-founder of Lattice Data, which was acquired by Apple in 2017.

== Education ==
- Ph.D., Computer Science, June 2009. University of Washington.
- M.Sc., Computer Science, 2005. University of Washington.
- M.Sc., Artificial Intelligence, 1997. University of Edinburgh.
- B.S., Computer Science, 1996. Brown University.
