= Opontia =

Dubai based e-commerce company

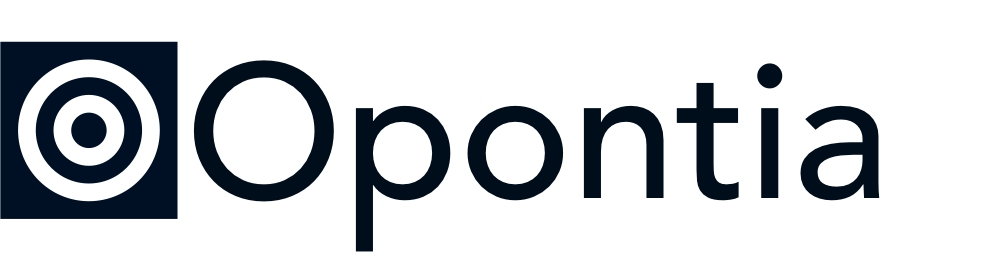
- Founded: February 2021; 5 years ago
- Founders: Philip Johnston; Manfred Meyer
- Headquarters: Dubai, UAE
- Area served: Central & Eastern Europe, the Middle East, and Africa
- Key people: Manfred Meyer (CEO); Salim Rennewi (COO
- Number of employees: 100+ (2021)
- Parent: Perfection
- Website: opontia.com

Opontia is an e-commerce company founded in February 2021 by Philip Johnston and Manfred Meyer. Headquartered in Dubai, it acquires online brands in the CEEMEA region (Central and Eastern Europe, the Middle East, and Africa). In 2023, the company announced on LinkedIn that it had been acquired by Perfection.

This compony acquires online brands that are already profitable and have a stable market presence. The company usually selects brands that earn a minimum monthly revenue of $10,000. Opontia works on growing existing brands by improving operations, centralizing logistics and distribution, and supporting digital marketing and product management. Furthermore, the company organizes small, dedicated teams for each brand and uses data to help manage performance, product selection, and entry into new sales channels. Opontia also focuses on products that are less affected by seasonal changes to maintain stable revenue across its portfolio. This strategy is intended to support steady growth and consistent management across multiple brands.

== History ==
Opontia was founded in February 2021 by entrepreneur Philip Johnston and by Manfred Meyer, who previously held executive roles at Next Commerce, Digikala, and Lazada.

In June 2021, Opontia raised US$20 million in seed funding from Global Founders Capital, Presight Capital, Raed Ventures and Kingsway Capital, in addition to angel investors.

Opontia has expanded across the CEEMEA region (Central and Eastern Europe, the Middle East, and Africa). It began with offices in Dubai and Riyadh and opened offices in Turkey in August 2021 and in Poland in October 2021.

In December 2021, Opontia raised US$42 million in equity and venture debt in a series A round, In 2021, the company was ranked 12th in Forbes Middle East's 50 Most-Funded Startups list.

Opontia acquires and seeks to expand already profitable e-commerce brands. In July 2021, it acquired Novimed, a UAE producer of consumer medical products. By the end of 2021, the company reported agreements with 15 e-commerce brands.

According to its LinkedIn, Opontia was acquired by Perfection in 2023.
