= SambaNova =

American artificial intelligence company

SambaNova Systems, Inc.
- Type: Private
- Industry: Artificial intelligence
- Founded: 2017
- Founder: Kunle Olukotun, Christopher Ré, and Rodrigo Liang
- Headquarters: San Jose, California, United States
- Products: Artificial intelligence hardware, AI inference systems, cloud AI platforms, and AI software
- Website: https://www.sambanova.ai

SambaNova is an American artificial intelligence (AI) and semiconductor hardware company. The company designs and manufactures hardware accelerators termed Reconfigurable Dataflow Units (RDUs) adjusted for deep learning models and generative AI applications.

== History ==
SambaNova was co-founded in November 2017 by Kunle Olukotun, Christopher Ré, and Rodrigo Liang. The technical foundation of the entity was derived from microprocessing array research for machine learning systems that received funding from the Defense Advanced Research Projects Agency (DARPA).

In 2019, SambaNova secured a $150 million investment from Intel and Alphabet. In 2020, the company raised another $250 million from existing and new investors.

The company’s valuation rose to $5 billion in 2021 and a funding round of $676 million was led by SoftBank Vision Fund 2 in April of that year. Other investors included Temasek and GIC, bringing SambaNova’s total funds raised to $1 billion.

In the early 2020s, SambaNova started cloud-based AI services and inference platforms. In 2021, it remained focused on AI chip design, but also began offering dataflow-as-a-service to support its clients in implementing and managing AI-powered hardware products. In 2023, the company introduced the SN40L reconfigurable dataflow unit (RDU), a processor for AI models and inference workloads. The AI chip powered the SambaNova Suite, a full-stack large language model (LLM) platform. The product provides open source generative AI models that can be customized.

In 2024, Time listed SambaNova Suite on its annual Best Inventions list and in 2026, it was included in the Forbes AI 50.

Samba-1, a generative AI bundle of 56 models, was announced in February, 2024 and further improved the ability of SambaNova’s customers to create and deploy generative AI models.

In February 2026, SambaNova held another funding round, raising $350 million. Vista Equity Partners and Cambium Capital led the round. The investment helped fund SambaNova’s SN50 RDU AI chip and grow the SambaCloud platform.

As of July 2026, the company was valued at $11 billion. Also in July, the company closed the first round of Series F funding, in which it raised $1 billion, led by General Atlantic. That same month, SambaNova secured a partnership with JPMorgan Chase to provide inference infrastructure services using the SN40L and SN50 RDU chips.

== Technology ==
SambaNova develops AI computing systems based on a reconfigurable dataflow architecture intended for machine learning and generative AI applications. Its hardware platform is built around the Reconfigurable Dataflow Unit (RDU), a processor architecture intended to improve data movement and computation for AI workloads. The company offers cloud and on-premises systems used for AI inference and model deployment.

SambaNova computing hardware platforms have been used in public research labs and supercomputing complexes to test alternative acceleration models for scientific calculations. The United States Department of Energy's Argonne National Laboratory integrated the SambaNova computing framework within its specialized AI Testbed located at the Argonne Leadership Computing Facility (ALCF). In Japan, the Riken Center for Computational Science (R-CCS) deployed SambaNova systems to operate alongside the Fugaku supercomputer. SambaNova's technology is also used in newer AI inference projects, including Vector Core Compute and OVHcloud to power their AI Endpoints platform.

The SN50 RDU AI chip, which was unveiled in February 2026 and was released in the second half of 2026, was first deployed by SoftBank Corp. at its Japan-based data centers. Independent testing by Artificial Analysis showed the SN50 was able to achieve decode speeds of 763 tokens per second (TPS) on MiniMax M2.7.
