= Lucidworks =

SaaS software company

Lucidworks Inc.
- Type: Private
- Industry: Enterprise search Internet search Ecommerce; Customer Service; Information technology Information access Open source software Artificial intelligence
- Founded: 2007
- Headquarters: San Francisco, California, United States
- Area served: Americas; EMEA; APAC
- Key people: Mike Sinoway; (CEO); Reade Frank; (President & Chief Financial Officer); Guy Sperry; (CTO); Lana Klestoff; (Chief Client Officer)
- Products: Search Engines; Support, Consulting, and Training around Apache Lucene and Apache Solr; Lucidworks Search Platform
- Revenue: US$75 million (August 2025)
- Number of employees: 250+
- Website: www.lucidworks.com

Lucidworks Platform
- Stable release: 5.12 / March 28, 2024; 2 years ago
- Written in: Java
- Type: Search and index
- Website: www.lucidworks.com

Lucidworks is a San Francisco, California-based SaaS software company that specializes in enterprise commerce, customer service, and workplace search applications. It is notable for being among the first companies to integrate LLMs and machine learning with search, deploying its first LLM in 2018 and deep learning recommenders as early as 2019. They are also noted for publishing an annual State of Generative AI in Global Business benchmark report.

== Business model ==
Lucidworks operates primarily with a subscription-based business model. They offer an enterprise-grade solution for designing, building, and deploying search and product discovery applications, as well as subscriptions for support, training, and integration services for open source search software. As of 2024, Lucidworks offers its flagship Lucidworks Platform as a quick-start package that includes four core components: Commerce Studio, Analytics Studio, Neural Hybrid Search, and data integration, along with other optional add-ons.

Lucidworks also publishes an annual benchmark report, titled The State of Generative AI in Global Business. Lucidworks' benchmark reports have been noted for documenting the extremely cautious real-world deployment of enterprise AI, and for noting the likelihood that few companies are currently equipped to fruitfully deploy AI as of 2025.

== Company history ==
Lucidworks was founded in 2007 under the name Lucid Imagination and launched in 2009. The company was later renamed Lucidworks in 2012. The founding technical team consisted of Marc Krellenstein, Grant Ingersoll, Erik Hatcher, and Yonik Seeley, in addition to advisor Doug Cutting.

In September 2014, Lucidworks began its foray into enhanced enterprise search with Lucidworks Fusion, a platform for building search and discovery applications. This platform is built on a core composed of open-source search technology Apache Solr and the Apache Spark computation framework. Three years later, in mid-2017, Lucidworks announced its acquisition of Twigkit, a software company specializing in user experiences for search and big data applications. This was later integrated into the Fusion platform as Fusion App Studio. Later that year, in September 2017, Reddit partnered with Lucidworks to build its new search application on this platform. Nick Caldwell, the VP of engineering at Reddit, stated at the time that Lucidworks "had the right combination of technology and the ability to augment his engineering team, while helping search to continually evolve on Reddit." Soon after, in 2018, Lucidworks released Lucidworks Site Search, an embeddable, configurable, out-of-the-box site search solution that could run either on the cloud or on-premises.

These advancements in enterprise search and user experience have proven advantageous for businesses. An independent study by Forrester Consulting found that Lucidworks users documented a 391% three-year ROI. Gartner subsequently named Lucidworks a "Leader" in the 2024 Gartner Magic Quadrant for search and product discovery category. In December 2024, Lucidworks published statistics from its clients during the peak holiday shopping periods, reporting the ability of its platform to handle 301,000 searches per minute.

== Funding ==
Lucidworks received Series A funding from Basis Technology, Granite Ventures, and Walden International in September 2008, with In-Q-Tel as a strategic investor. In August 2014, Lucidworks closed an $8 million Series C round with Shasta Ventures, Basis Technology, Granite Ventures, and Walden International participating. In November 2015, Lucidworks closed a $21 million Series D funding round, with Allegis Capital and existing investors Shasta Ventures and Granite Ventures participating. In May 2018, the firm announced a $50 million Series E led by Top Tier Capital Partners, with participation from Silver Lake's growth capital fund, Silver Lake Waterman. In August 2019, Lucidworks announced $100 million in Series F funding, led by Francisco Partners and TPG Sixth Street Partners, with existing investors Top Tier Capital Partners, Shasta Ventures, Granite Ventures, and Allegis.

== Awards ==
- Finalist for the 2010 Red Herring 100 North America Award
- Winner, InfoWorld 2017 Technology of the Year
- Winner, 2025 Enterprise AI Search Solution of the Year by AI Breakthrough Awards
