= Kibana =

Data visualization plugin for Elasticsearch

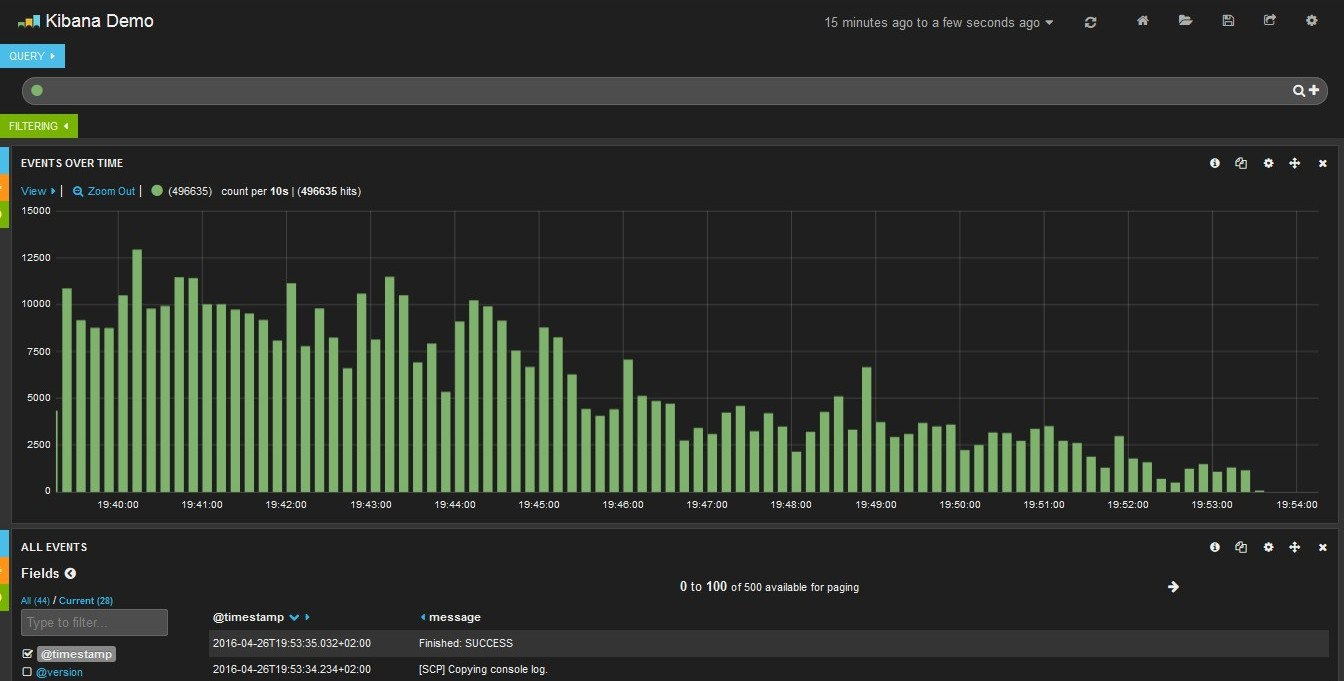
- Developer: Elastic NV
- Stable release: 9.2.1 / 11 November 2025; 11 months ago
- Written in: TypeScript, JavaScript
- Operating system: Cross-platform
- License: Triple-licensed Elastic License 2.0 (proprietary; source-available), Server Side Public License (proprietary; source-available) and Affero General Public License (free and open-source)
- Website: www.elastic.co/products/kibana
- Repository: github.com/elastic/kibana

Kibana is a free and open-source data visualization dashboard software for Elasticsearch, an enterprise search engine.

== History ==
Kibana is a source-available data visualization dashboard software that provides visualization capabilities on top of the content indexed on an Elasticsearch cluster. Users can create bar, line and scatter plots, or pie charts and maps on top of large volumes of data.

Kibana also provides a presentation tool, referred to as Canvas, that allows users to create slide decks that pull live data directly from Elasticsearch.

The combination of Elasticsearch, Logstash, and Kibana, referred to as the "Elastic Stack" (formerly the "ELK stack"), is available as a product or service. Logstash provides an input stream to Elasticsearch for storage and search, and Kibana accesses the data for visualizations such as dashboards. Elastic also provides "Beats" packages which can be configured to provide pre-made Kibana visualizations and dashboards about various database and application technologies.

In December 2019, Elastic introduced Kibana Lens product, which is a simpler drag-and-drop user interface than the original aggregation based visualizations.

In May 2021, OpenSearch released the first beta of OpenSearch Dashboards, the Apache-licensed fork of Kibana sponsored by Amazon Web Services after Elastic discontinued the open source project and switched to proprietary software development.

In August 2024 the GNU Affero General Public License was added as an option, making Kibana free and open-source once again.

== See also ==
- OpenSearch (software), an open source fork of Kibana
