= Albert R. Meyer =

American theoretical computer scientist

Albert Ronald da Silva Meyer
- Born: November 5, 1941 (age 84)
- Education: Harvard University
- Spouse: Irene Greif
- Awards: ACM Fellow (2000)
- Scientific career
- Fields: Computer science
- Institutions: MIT
- Doctoral advisor: Patrick C. Fischer
- Doctoral students: Nancy Lynch, Leonid Levin, Jeanne Ferrante, Charles Rackoff, Larry Stockmeyer, David Harel, Joseph Halpern, John C. Mitchell, Edward McCreight, Val Tannen
- Website: people.csail.mit.edu/meyer/

Albert Ronald da Silva Meyer (born 1941) is Hitachi America Professor emeritus of computer science at Massachusetts Institute of Technology (MIT).

== Biography ==
Meyer received his PhD from Harvard University in 1972 in applied mathematics, under the supervision of Patrick C. Fischer. He joined the Department of Electrical Engineering and Computer Science (EECS) faculty at MIT in 1969. Meyer became the Hitachi America Professor of Computer Science and Engineering in 1991. He retired from MIT in 2016.

== Academic life ==
Mathematics for Computer Science (2017) by Eric Lehman, F. Thomson Leighton, and Albert R. Meyer

Meyer's seminal works include Meyer & Stockmeyer (1972), which introduced the polynomial hierarchy. He has supervised numerous PhD students who are now famous computer scientists; these include Nancy Lynch, Leonid Levin, Jeanne Ferrante, Charles Rackoff, Larry Stockmeyer, David Harel, Joseph Halpern, John C. Mitchell, and Val Tannen. He was the editor-in-chief of the international computer science journal Information and Computation from 1981 until 2020.

== Awards ==
He has been a Fellow of the American Academy of Arts and Sciences (AAAS) since 1987, and he was inducted as a Fellow of the Association for Computing Machinery (ACM) in 2000.

== Personal life ==
He is married to the computer scientist Irene Greif.

== Publications ==
- 1991. Research Directions in Computer Science: An MIT Perspective. (Ed. with John Guttag, Ronald Rivest, and Peter Szolovits) MIT Press.
- Meyer, Albert R.; Stockmeyer, Larry J. (1972). "The equivalence problem for regular expressions with squaring requires exponential space". Proc. 13th Annual Symposium on Switching and Automata Theory. pp. 125–129. doi:10.1109/SWAT.1972.29..

== See also ==
- LOOP (programming language)
