= Fermi Explorer =

Proposed interstellar mission

The Fermi Explorer Mission
- Fermi Explorer logo, 2026
- Founded: September 2026; 1 month ago in Redmond, Washington, US
- Founders: Philip Johnston (CEO); Kam Ghaffarian; Ezra Feilden; Adi Oltean; Garrett Jameson
- Type: 501(c)(3) non-profit organisation
- Headquarters: US
- CEO: Philip Johnston
- Website: www.fermiexplorer.org

The Fermi Explorer Mission a US non-profit organization that plans to launch the first spacecraft to another star. The project aims to launch a spacecraft, called Fermi Explorer, before the end of 2029 and to send the spacecraft at least 99% of the distance to Alpha Centauri, the nearest star system to the Sun. The proposed journey will take approximately 77,000 years, which is the optimum arrival time for least fuel and cost.

The mission is designed as a low-cost interstellar spacecraft, with a target budget of less than US$15 million for its design, construction, launch and operation.

== Organization ==
The Fermi Explorer Mission is a 501(c)(3) nonprofit initiative establish by Philip Johnston (Fermi Explorer CEO), Adi Oltean and Ezra Feilden, who are also founders of the space technology company Starcloud, together with program manager and former US Air Force officer, Garrett Jameson. The mission was announced on September 1st, 2026 and also has aerospace industry figures Rob Meyerson, former president of Blue Origin, and Pete Worden formerly the director of NASA's Ames Research Center, as well as academics such as Alexander Wissner-Gross and entrepreneur Lauren Selig, as advisers.

== Mission ==
The mission was named after physicist Enrico Fermi, after whom the Fermi Paradox is named, since the mission is intended to make the idea of interstellar travel real, and to encourage more people to confront one of humanity’s biggest unanswered questions when we look beyond our planet: "Where is everybody?", also known as the Fermi Paradox.

Fermi Explorer's primary objectives are to travel at least 99% of the distance to Alpha Centauri within 80,000 years, carry a payload of at least 1 kg, launch before the end of 2029, and remain within the project's US$15 million cost target.

Alpha Centauri is approximately 4.4 light-years from Earth. The mission's proposed trajectory would result in a closest approach to the system after approximately 77,000 years. The project has proposed a trajectory intended to minimise fuel requirements and maximise the spacecraft's available payload.

The proposed spacecraft is a small, solar-powered vehicle designed to use electric propulsion and largely flight-proven technology. The spacecraft is expected to have a mass of approximately 100–200 kg and to reach a final heliocentric cruise velocity of about 23.6 km/s. Its mission profile includes repeated close approaches to the Sun, with the spacecraft reaching approximately 0.42 astronomical units (AU) from the Sun, followed by propulsion burns near perihelion to gradually increase its heliocentric velocity. The spacecraft's planned configuration uses xenon as propellant, accounting for approximately 64% of its launch mass.

== Payload ==
The spacecraft is planned to carry a minimum payload of 1 kg within a 10 × 10 × 10 cm volume. The proposed payload includes a copy of the Voyager Golden Record, as well as scientific instruments and artistic contributions selected through future solicitation programmes.

The project has also proposed a programme allowing children from countries and regions around the world to contribute 300 characters in their own language to be carried aboard the spacecraft.

== Funding and feasibility ==
Fermi Explorer has set a target of less than US$15 million for the complete mission. The project is funded through donations and has published a feasibility assessment addressing the technical and financial requirements of the proposed mission.

The project estimates that the probability of complete mission success may be higher than the approximately 50% historical success rate it cites for new spacecraft, while advising potential donors to assume a probability of around 50%.

== See also ==
- Fermi Paradox
- Enrico Fermi
- Interstellar travel
- Interstellar probe
- Alpha Centauri
- Voyager program
- Voyager Golden Record
- Breakthrough Starshot
