= Chetan Puttagunta =

American venture capitalist

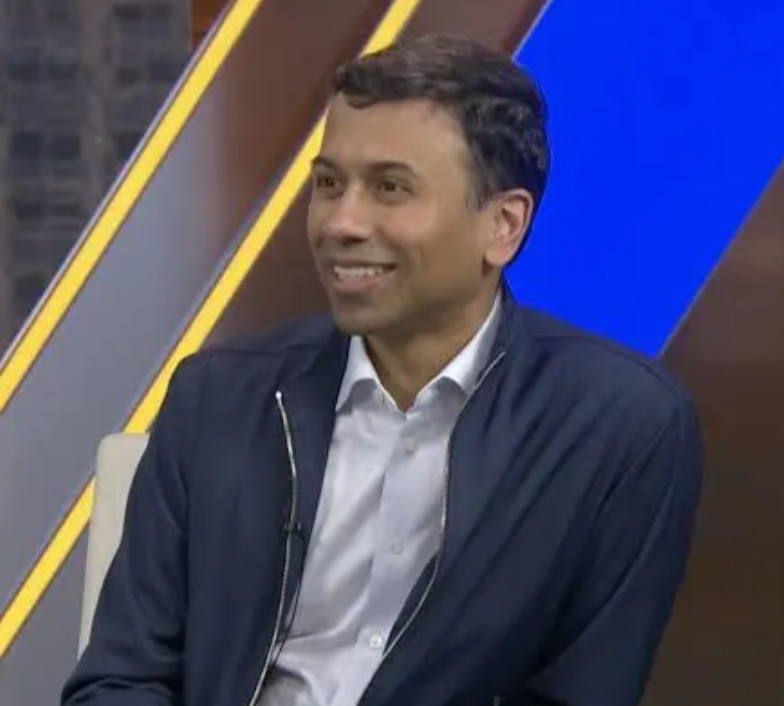
- Puttagunta in 2025
- Born: May 14, 1986 (age 40)
- Education: Stanford University
- Occupation: venture capitalist
- Employer: General Partner at Benchmark

Chetan Puttagunta (born May 14, 1986) is an American venture capital investor and General Partner at Benchmark, a venture capital firm.

He was named to Forbes Magazine's 30 under 30 in venture capital in 2015 and has been featured on The Forbes Midas List, a ranking of the world's top venture capital investors, for the last seven consecutive years.

== Early life and education ==
Puttagunta was born in Hyderabad, India, to chemist parents who emigrated to the United States. He attended Quince Orchard High School in Maryland. Puttagunta received his bachelor's degree in Electrical Engineering from Stanford University in 2007.

== Career ==
Following graduation, Puttagunta worked as an investment banker in technology M&A at Houlihan Lokey and with H.I.G. Capital's San Francisco office.

In 2011, he joined New Enterprise Associates (NEA), a venture capital firm investing in technology and healthcare companies. His notable investments at NEA include MuleSoft, MongoDB and Elastic, all of which he served on board of. In 2017, MongoDB and MuleSoft completed their initial public offerings, and in 2018, Salesforce acquired MuleSoft for approximately $6.5 billion. At the time of the acquisition, (NEA) was the company’s largest shareholder. In July 2018, he joined Benchmark as a General Partner at age 32.

Puttagunta currently serves on the boards of Elastic, where he is chairman, Modern Treasury, Legora, Airbyte, LangChain, Starcloud, fomo, Duffel, and others. He previously invested in Cursor (acquired by SpaceX), Manus (acquired by Meta), Acquia (acquired by Vista Equity), and Scout (acquired by Workday).

== Personal life ==
Puttagunta lives in San Francisco, CA.
