= Google Blog Search =

Blog search engine

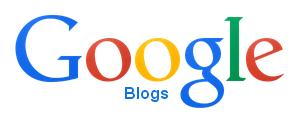
Google Blogs

Google Blog Search was a specialized service of Google used to search blogs. It was discontinued in May 2011. The Blog Search was "the first major search engine to offer full-blown blog and feed search capabilities". It was released in 2005. The bots appeared to be faster than the standard Googlebot, because updates to blogs often become available within hours instead of weeks taken by Googlebot default. The Blog Search searches were done identically to the Google Search by typing your search terms in the search field and seeing the most relevant results related to the topic. The Blog Search looked at various services in the world of blogs like Blogger, LiveJournal, and Weblog. For some time it was possible to force Google to access and search the Blogsearch database by manually formatting the URL in your browser's address bar. But in March 2016, Google also took away this access.

== Critical response ==
The following aspects of the Google Blog Search service were met with praise: its ability to index new posts quickly, the option to sort results both "by date" and "by relevance", and the "Advanced search" options which allows for more specific searches. The "Frequently-Asked Questions list" was seen as covering the basics quite well. On the other hand, the "related blogs" service was criticized due to it omitting some of the more prominent niche blogs from searches, including defunct blogs, and spam blogs. Filtering spam was cited as a challenge for the technology, as there have been cases of spam posts appearing in the blogs and posts that the technology located and identified. In a review by Duncan Riley of the Blog Herald, the service was critiqued based on different criteria: search (which was given a "B"), numbers (which was given a "C−"), and size (which was given a "D"). Although the version tested was a beta test, the reviewer was disappointed as "you’d expect something really good from Google". He compared the usefulness of the technology to Technorati, except "with half as many results but without the error messages". In other reviews, the service's speed was commented on in a favourable light, one such review describing it as "freaking fast".

== Deprecation ==
On May 26, 2011, Google announced that Google Blog Search API would be deprecated, along with several other APIs. As per the deprecation policy, Google Blog Search was shut down on May 26, 2011.

As of February 9, 2017, Google's blog search was still available. Access to Google blog search required the user be on a Google search page, then to click on "News" and then click the "Tools" button. A new menu bar then appeared below the "Tools" button, and to the left. Clicking the "All news" option made a dropdown menu appear, with the options of "All news" and "Blogs". The user could then select "Blogs".

By February 2021, the "Blogs" option appeared to have completely disappeared from Google's search options. However, users of Google Alerts were still able to select "blogs" as the source for a particular custom alert.

== See also ==
- Search as a service
