= Starcloud =

American company

Starcloud, Inc.
- Starcloud logo since 2026
- Type: Private
- Industry: Space
- Founded: January 2024; 2 years ago in El Segundo, California, US
- Founders: Philip Johnston; Ezra Feilden; Adi Oltean
- Headquarters: Redmond, Washington, US
- Key people: Philip Johnston (CEO); Ezra Feilden (CTO); Adi Oltean (Chief Engineer); Chetan Puttagunta (Board Member)
- Number of employees: 35 (2026)
- Website: www.starcloud.com

Starcloud, Inc. is a United States-based company that designs, builds, and deploys data centers in space using proprietary technology. In November, 2025, Starcloud launched a satellite with the first NVIDIA H100, which enabled it to train the first AI model in space. In March 2026, Starcloud became the fastest unicorn in Y Combinator history, hitting a $1.1bn valuation just 17 months after completing the program. In August 2026, Starcloud raised an additional $250M at a $2.3Bn valuation, with NVIDIA, Cisco, and Benchmark investing in the round.

== History ==
The company was founded in January 2024 in El Segundo, California under the name Lumen Orbit by Philip Johnston (ex-McKinsey & Company), Adi Oltean (ex-SpaceX, Microsoft Azure) and Ezra Feilden (ex-Airbus Defence and Space). Soon after founding, in February 2024, the company relocated to Redmond, Washington to be close to the space and data center talent at Starlink, Amazon Leo, AWS, and Azure.

In Summer 2024, the company released a white paper and went through the Y Combinator startup accelerator in San Francisco, where they were selected by Tom Blomfield and raised one of the largest seed rounds ever at Y Combinator demo day.

In March 2025, the company rebranded to Starcloud after a legal challenge from Lumen Technologies and raised additional seed funding, bringing the total to approximately $34M. Investors include the scout funds of Sequoia and A16z, In-Q-Tel, NFX, Plug and Play, as well as angels, including AI expert Jan Leike.

In November 2025, Starcloud launched its first test satellite, designated Starcloud-1, equipped with a Nvidia H100 GPU which Nvidia claimed was 100x more powerful GPU compute than had been in orbit before. The company described the mission as the first deployment of "data-center-class GPU compute" in orbit.

Starcloud-1 deployment from a SpaceX Falcon 9 rocket on November 2nd, 2025

Starcloud stated that the project aimed to explore how orbital conditions, including continuous solar exposure and radiative cooling, could support large-scale computing in space.

In December 2025, Starcloud became the first company to operate a large language model on a high powered GPU (Gemini's Gemma, developed by Google DeepMind) on board a spacecraft, and the first to perform in-orbit training of a large language model (nanoGPT, developed by Andrej Karpathy).

On February 3, 2026, Starcloud submitted a proposal to the FCC for a constellation of up to 88,000 satellites for orbital data centers.

On March 7, 2026, Starcloud announced that it intended to be the first to mine Bitcoin in space, flying bitcoin mining ASICs on its second satellite, Starcloud-2.

On March 30, 2026, Starcloud announced that it had raised a $170M Series A at a $1.1bn valuation led by Benchmark and EQT Ventures. The raise made Starcloud the fastest company to reach unicorn status in Y Combinator history, 17 months after completing the program.

On May 26, 2026, Starcloud announced that it had signed a contract with SpaceX to integrate Starlink mini-lasers onto its next 25 satellites to provide high-bandwidth, low-latency connectivity.

In August 2026, Starcloud announced it had raised an additional $250M at a $2.3Bn valuation, with NVIDIA investing $25M and Cisco and Benchmark participating in the round.

== Partnerships ==
In 2024, Starcloud was selected as a member of the Nvidia Inception program, the Google Cloud Accelerator, and the Defense Innovation Unit Accelerator.

In October 2025, Crusoe and Starcloud announced an agreement, as Crusoe will deploy its "Crusoe Cloud" platform on a Starcloud satellite planned for late 2026. Under this agreement, GPU capacity from orbit is expected to be offered from early 2027.

Starcloud-1 is also using the H100 to run high-powered inference on Synthetic-aperture radar (SAR) data from Capella Space in order to draw insights on orbit for the first time, without needing to downlink the data before being able to analyse it.

== See also ==
- Space-based data center
- Fermi Explorer – Proposed interstellar mission
