= Space-based data center =

Proposed orbital infrastructure

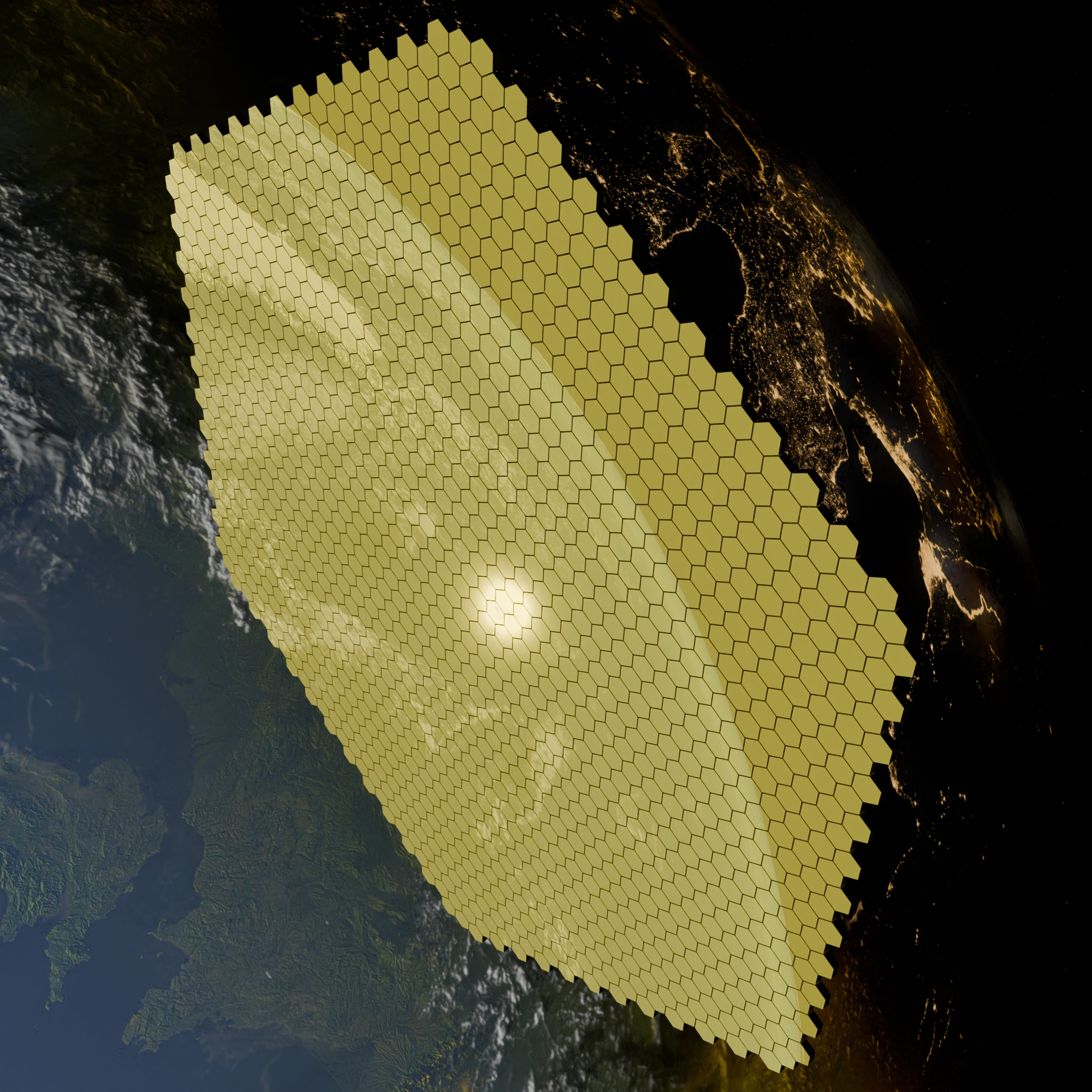
Design of a sun-synchronous orbit data center, they would orbit above the dawn / dusk transition of the planet.

Sun-synchronous orbit animation of AI supercomputing satellites

3D concept of Lunar sun-synchronous data centers

Space-based data centers or orbital AI infrastructure are proposed concepts to build AI data centers in the sun-synchronous orbit or other orbits using space-based solar power.

Space-based edge computing has historical roots in military architectures designed to bypass the latency of ground-based targeting networks. In the 1980s, the Strategic Defense Initiative's Brilliant Pebbles program first envisioned autonomous on-orbit data processing for space-based missile defense. In 2019, the Space Development Agency (SDA) began to revive this decentralized approach through its Proliferated Warfighter Space Architecture (PWSA). This ambitious "sensor-to-shooter" infrastructure is treated as a prerequisite for the modern Golden Dome program, which would rely on space-based data processing to continuously track targets.

== History ==
Early thinking about space-based computing infrastructure grew out of mid-20th-century visions for large orbital industrial systems, most notably proposals for space-based solar power, which were popularized in both technical literature and science writing by figures such as Isaac Asimov in the 1940s. These ideas emphasized exploiting the vacuum of space, continuous solar energy, and thermal characteristics of space to support power-intensive activities that would be difficult or inefficient on Earth.

In the 21st century, advances in small satellites, reusable launch vehicles, and high-performance computing revived interest in space-based data centers, with governments and private companies exploring orbital or near-space platforms for edge computing, secure data handling, and low-latency processing of Earth-observation data.

In September 2024, venture capital company Y Combinator-backed Starcloud released a white paper detailing plans to build multiple gigawatts of AI compute in orbit. It was the first widely cited proposal to actually start building large orbital data centers.

In 2025, Starcloud deployed an NVIDIA H100-class system and became the first company to train a large language model (LLM) in space and run a version of Google Gemini in space.

Starcloud-1 deployment from a SpaceX Falcon 9 rocket on November 2nd, 2025

In March 2025, Lonestar deployed a data backup machine on the surface of the moon.

In early January 2026, a team from the University of Pennsylvania presented a tether-based architecture for orbital data centers at the AIAA SciTech conference. The design relied on gravity gradient tension and solar-pressure-based passive attitude stabilization to minimize the mass of MW-scale orbital data centers.

In January 2026, SpaceX filed plans with the US Federal Communications Commission (FCC) for millions of satellites, leveraging reusable launches and Starlink integration to extend cloud and AI computing into orbit. Around the same time, Blue Origin announced the TeraWave constellation of about 5,400 satellites, designed to provide high‑throughput networking for data centers, enterprise, and government customers. Meanwhile, China announced a 200,000‑satellite constellation, focusing on state coordination, data sovereignty, and in-orbit processing for secure, time-critical applications.

In February 2026, Starcloud submitted a proposal to the US FCC for a constellation of up to 88,000 satellites for orbital data centers. In March, it announced intentions to be the first to mine Bitcoin in space, flying bitcoin mining ASICs on its second satellite, Starcloud-2.

In May 2026, Edge Aerospace was awarded a contract by the European Space Agency under its Space Cloud program to study use cases, architectures and an implementation roadmap for orbital data centers.

== Feasibility ==
In October 2025, Nature Electronics published a study led by a research group at Nanyang Technological University on the development of carbon-neutral data centres in space.

In November 2025, Google published a feasibility study on space-based data centers. The authors argued that if launch costs to low earth orbit reached US$200/kg, the launch cost for data center satellites could be cost effective relative to current energy costs for ground-based data centers. They project this may occur around 2035 if SpaceX's Starship project scales to 180 launches/year by then.

== Disadvantages ==
The deployment of space-based data centers raises several technical, economic, and environmental concerns.

- Existing launch costs are substantial and remain the main cost of space infrastructure deployment
- Cooling is limited to heat dissipation through radiation only. This is inefficient compared to convection used in terrestrial data centers
- Space infrastructure must be designed to survive launch and to work under environment conditions of radiation, wide range of temperatures, in vacuum and in microgravity
- In-space assembly is in an early development stage to enable deployment of mega-structures
- Megastructures are particularly exposed to orbital debris
- Solar arrays efficiency decrease 0.5% to 0.8% per year due to exposure of ultraviolet rays, space weathering and orbital thermal cycles
- Hardware is designed for limited lifespan
  - Maintenance and repair in space, known as on-orbit servicing (OOS), is still in an early stage of practical implementation
  - Disposable data centre: technology obsolescence of AI data centre being a concern and difficult maintenance in space imply the single-use purpose of those space data centres
- To extend lifetime, space infrastructure will require either refueling or orbit raise by the servicer, which would increase its operational costs
- Sun-synchronous orbit is a limited resource and proper management and sharing of it is required
- The environmental impact on Earth has its own challenges
  - The environmental impact of launches need to be addressed
  - Deployment consumes Earth resources that cannot be recovered or recycled; computers require many resources, some of which are strategic and recycling e-waste is already a challenge on Earth and extremely unlikely in space
- Space debris (orbit pollution) is another sustainability challenge for space
  - Orbits are, like any resource, a limited physical and electromagnetic resource and available for all mankind; the accumulation of satellites on a particular orbit reduces the use of space for other purposes
  - A consequence of the increase of satellites in orbit is a higher risk of the runaway of space debris (see Kessler syndrome) which means some orbits could become unusable
- Latency and bandwidth are constrained in space, and consume limited electromagnetic resources
- Satellite flares could inhibit ground-based and space-based observational astronomy

== Companies pursuing space-based AI infrastructure ==
- Blue Origin
- Cowboy Space Corporation (formerly Aetherflux)
- Edge Aerospace
- Google – Project Suncatcher
- Intercosmic Energy
- Nvidia
- OpenAI
- SpaceX – see Starmind (satellite)
- Starcloud

== See also ==
- Dyson sphere
- Interplanetary Internet
- Kardashev scale
- Laser communication in space, microwave transmission, and communications satellite.
- Matrioshka brain
- Space launch market
- Space Network and Near Earth Network
- Solar cell research and solar-cell efficiency
- Solar panels on spacecraft
- Stargate
- Starlink
- Terafab
