= Swiftype =

American search and index company

- Type: Private
- Industry: Software; Information Technology; Search Engines
- Genre: Search and index
- Founded: January 2012
- Headquarters: San Francisco, California
- Area served: Worldwide
- Key people: Matt Riley (CEO); Quin Hoxie (CTO)
- Products: Site Search; App Search; Enterprise Search
- Number of employees: 40
- Parent: Elastic
- Website: www.swiftype.com

Swiftype is a search and index company based in San Francisco, California, that provides search software for organizations, websites, and computer programs. Notable customers include AT&T, Dr. Pepper, Hubspot and TechCrunch.

== History ==
Swiftype was founded in 2012 by Matt Riley and Quin Hoxie. The company participated in Y Combinator’s incubator program and received investment from a number of prominent sources. Their site search uses semantic understanding of queries to differentiate the meaning of words based on their use.

In September 2013, Swiftype obtained Series A funding from New Enterprise Associates (NEA). In March 2015, Swiftype raised an additional $13 million in Series B funding led by NEA for a total of $20 million in funding.

Swiftype's site search can be used for faceted search, full text search, real-time search, and concept search queries. The company's plans offer on-demand and live recrawls and indexing of websites. Other features include drag and drop result customization, real-time analytics and adjustable weights.

In an effort to further grow outside of site search, Swiftype introduced an enterprise search service in February 2017. It aimed to help organizations find their data across different services like G Suite, Office 365, Dropbox, Zendesk and more. It also offers an API for searching custom data sources. Swiftype also introduced an artificial intelligence that interprets the queries and builds an "enterprise knowledge graph" from the data it accesses.

Swiftype was acquired by Elastic in November 2017. Elastic powers Elasticsearch, a tool Swiftype had previously used to index and store their search content. While the acquisition didn't provide any drastic changes, they did set a new introductory price and work to incorporate some of Elastic's search features into their Enterprise Search.

In May 2018, Swiftype introduced Elastic App Search Service, a new search product for developers.

== See also ==
- Elastic NV
- Elasticsearch
