= Apache Nutch =

Open source web crawler

- Screenshot Nutch Web Interface Search
- Original authors: Doug Cutting, Mike Cafarella
- Developer: Apache Software Foundation
Stable release
- 1.x: 1.21 / 20 July 2025; 3 months ago
- 2.x: 2.4 / 11 October 2019; 6 years ago
- Repository: Nutch Github Repository
- Written in: Java
- Operating system: Cross-platform
- Type: Web crawler
- License: Apache License 2.0
- Website: nutch.apache.org

Apache Nutch is a highly extensible and scalable open source web crawler software project.

== Features ==
Nutch robot mascot

Nutch is coded entirely in the Java programming language, but data is written in language-independent formats. It has a highly modular architecture, allowing developers to create plug-ins for media-type parsing, data retrieval, querying and clustering.

The fetcher ("robot" or "web crawler") has been written from scratch specifically for this project.

== History ==
Nutch originated with Doug Cutting, creator of both Lucene and Hadoop, and Mike Cafarella.

In June, 2003, a successful 100-million-page demonstration system was developed. To meet the multi-machine processing needs of the crawl and index tasks, the Nutch project has also implemented the MapReduce project and a distributed file system. The two projects have been spun out into their own subproject, called Hadoop.

In January, 2005, Nutch joined the Apache Incubator, from which it graduated to become a subproject of Lucene in June of that same year. Since April, 2010, Nutch has been considered an independent, top level project of the Apache Software Foundation.

In February 2014 the Common Crawl project adopted Nutch for its open, large-scale web crawl.

=== Release history ===
1.x Branch	2.x Branch	Release date	Description
1.1		2010-06-06	This release includes several major upgrades of existing libraries (Hadoop, Solr, Tika, etc.) on which Nutch depends. Various bug fixes, and speedups (e.g., to Fetcher2) have also been included.
1.2		2010-10-24	This release includes several improvements (addition of parse-html as a selectable parser again, configurable per-field indexing), new features (including adding timing information to all Tool classes, and implementation of parser timeouts), and bug fixes (fixing an NPE in distributed search, fixing of XML formatting issues per Document fields).
1.3		2011-06-07	This release includes several improvements (improved RSS parsing support, tighter integration with Apache Tika, external parsing support, improved language identification and an order of magnitude smaller source release tarball—only about 2 MB).
1.4		2011-11-26	This release includes several improvements including allowing Parsers to declare support for multiple MIME types, configurable Fetcher Queue depth, Fetcher speed improvements, tighter Tika integration, and support for HTTP auth in Solr indexing.
1.5		2012-06-07	This release includes several improvements including upgrades of several major components including Tika 1.1 and Hadoop 1.0.0, improvements to LinkRank and WebGraph elements as well as a number of new plugins covering blacklisting, filtering and parsing to name a few.
	2.0	2012-07-07	This release offers users an edition focused on large scale crawling which builds on storage abstraction (via Apache Gora) for big data stores such as Apache Accumulo, Apache Avro, Apache Cassandra, Apache HBase, HDFS, an in memory data store and various high-profile SQL stores.
1.5.1		2012-07-10	This release is a maintenance release of the popular 1.5.X mainstream version of Nutch which has been widely adopted within the community.
	2.1	2012-10-05	This release continues to provide Nutch users with a simplified Nutch distribution building on the 2.x development drive which is growing in popularity amongst the community. As well as addressing ~20 bugs this release also offers improved properties for better Solr configuration, upgrades to various Gora dependencies and the introduction of the option to build indexes in elastic search.
1.6		2012-12-06	This release includes over 20 bug fixes, the same in improvements, as well as new functionalities including a new HostNormalizer, the ability to dynamically set fetchInterval by MIME-type and functional enhancements to the Indexer API including the normalization of URLs and the deletion of robots noIndex documents. Other notable improvements include the upgrade of key dependencies to Tika 1.2 and Automaton 1.11-8.
	2.2	2013-06-08	This release includes over 30 bug fixes and over 25 improvements representing the third release of increasingly popular 2.x Nutch series. This release features inclusion of Crawler-Commons which Nutch now utilizes for improved robots.txt parsing, library upgrades to Apache Hadoop 1.1.1, Apache Gora 0.3, Apache Tika 1.2 and Automaton 1.11-8.
1.7		2013-06-24	This release includes over 20 bug fixes, as many improvements; most noticeably featuring a new pluggable indexing architecture which currently supports Apache Solr and Elastic Search. Shadowing the recent Nutch 2.2 release, parsing of Robots.txt is now delegated to Crawler-Commons. Key library upgrades have been made to Apache Hadoop 1.2.0 and Apache Tika 1.3.
	2.2.1	2013-07-02	This release includes library upgrades to Apache Hadoop 1.2.0 and Apache Tika 1.3, it is predominantly a bug fix for NUTCH-1591 - Incorrect conversion of ByteBuffer to String.
1.8		2014-03-17	Although this release includes library upgrades to Crawler Commons 0.3 and Apache Tika 1.5, it also provides over 30 bug fixes as well as 18 improvements.
	2.3	2015-01-22	Nutch 2.3 release now comes packaged with a self-contained Apache Wicket-based Web Application. The SQL backend for Gora has been deprecated.
1.10		2015-05-06	This release includes library upgrades to Tika 1.6, also provides over 46 bug fixes as well as 37 improvements and 12 new features.
1.11		2015-12-07	This release includes library upgrades to Hadoop 2.X, Tika 1.11, also provides over 32 bug fixes as well as 35 improvements and 14 new features.
	2.3.1	2016-01-21	This bug fix release contains around 40 issues addressed.
1.12		2016-06-18	
1.13		2017-04-02	
1.14		2017-12-23	
1.15		2018-08-09	
1.16		2019-10-11	
	2.4	2019-10-11	Expected to be the last release on the 2.X series, as "no committer is actively working on it".
1.17		2020-07-02	
1.18		2021-01-24	
1.19		2022-08-22	
1.20		2024-04-09	
1.21		2025-07-20	

== Scalability ==
IBM Research studied the performance of Nutch/Lucene as part of its Commercial Scale Out (CSO) project. Their findings were that a scale-out system, such as Nutch/Lucene, could achieve a performance level on a cluster of blades that was not achievable on any scale-up computer such as the POWER5.

The ClueWeb09 dataset (used in e.g. TREC) was gathered using Nutch, with an average speed of 755.31 documents per second.

== Related projects ==
- Hadoop – Java framework that supports distributed applications running on large clusters.

== Search engines built with Nutch ==
- Common Crawl – publicly available internet-wide crawls, started using Nutch in 2014.
- Creative Commons Search – an implementation of Nutch, used in the period of 2004–2006.
- DiscoverEd – Open educational resources search prototype developed by Creative Commons
- Krugle uses Nutch to crawl web pages for code, archives and technically interesting content.
- mozDex (inactive)
- Wikia Search - launched 2008, closed down 2009

== Bibliography ==
- Shoberg, J (October 26, 2006). Building Search Applications with Lucene and Nutch (1st ed.). Apress. p. 350. ISBN 978-1-59059-687-6. Archived from the original on December 2, 2009.
