= Probabilistic database =

List of probabilistic data structures for databases

A probabilistic database is an uncertain database in which each element (eg a record in a relational database) has an associated probability. Probabilistic database management systems are currently an active area of research. "While there are currently no commercial probabilistic database systems, several research prototypes exist..."

Probabilistic databases distinguish between the logical data model and the physical representation of the data much like relational databases do in the ANSI-SPARC Architecture. In probabilistic databases this is even more crucial since such databases have to represent very large numbers of possible worlds, often exponential in the size of one world (a classical database), succinctly.

== Structure ==
In a probabilistic database, each data item is associated with a probability greater than 0 and less than or equal to 1, representing the accuracy of the data item.

=== Possible worlds ===
A probabilistic database could exist in multiple states. For example, if there is uncertainty about the existence of a tuple in the database, then the database could be in two different states with respect to that tuple—the first state contains the tuple, while the second one does not. Similarly, if an attribute can take one of the values x, y or z, then the database can be in three different states with respect to that attribute.

Each of these states is called a possible world.

Consider the following database:

An Incomplete Database
A	B
a1	b1
a2	b2
a3	{b3, b3′, b3′′}

(Here {b3, b3′, b3′′} denotes that the attribute can take any of the values b3, b3′ or b3′′)

- Assuming that there is uncertainty about the first tuple, certainty about the second tuple, and uncertainty about the value of attribute B in the third tuple.

Then the actual state of the database may or may not contain the first tuple (depending on whether it is correct or not). Similarly, the value of the attribute B may be b3, b3′ or b3′′.

Consequently, the possible worlds corresponding to the database are as follows:

World 1
A	B
a1	b1
a2	b2
a3	b3

World 2
A	B
a1	b1
a2	b2
a3	b3′

World 3
A	B
a1	b1
a2	b2
a3	b3′′

World 4
A	B
a2	b2
a3	b3

World 5
A	B
a2	b2
a3	b3′

World 6
A	B
a2	b2
a3	b3′′

=== Types of Uncertainties ===
There are essentially two kinds of uncertainties that could exist in a probabilistic database, as described in the table below:

Types of Uncertainties
Tuple-level uncertainty	Attribute-level uncertainty
Uncertainty if a tuple is correct or not, that is, whether it should exist in the database or not.	Uncertainty about the values that an attribute of a tuple can take, that is, it could take one of the several possible values.
Corresponding to each uncertain tuple, there are two possible worlds: one which includes the tuple while the other which does not.	Corresponding to each uncertain attribute which can take one of the values a_{1},...,a_{n}, there are n possible worlds.
Tuple-level uncertainty can be seen as a boolean random variable associated with each uncertain tuple.	Attribute-level uncertainty can be seen as a random variable associated with each uncertain attribute which can take values a_{1},...,a_{n}.

By assigning values to random variables associated with the data items, different possible worlds can be represented.

== History ==
The first published use of the term "probabilistic database" was probably in the 1987 VLDB conference paper "The theory of probabilistic databases", by Cavallo and Pittarelli.
