= Elastic (company) =

Company behind search engine Elasticsearch

Elastic N.V.
- Formerly: Elasticsearch
- Type: Public company (NV)
- Traded as: NYSE: ESTC; Russell 1000 component
- Industry: Software
- Founded: 2012; 14 years ago
- Founders: Shay Banon; Steven Schuurman; Uri Boness; Simon Willnauer
- Headquarters: Amsterdam, the Netherlands
- Key people: Ashutosh Kulkarni (CEO); Shay Banon (CTO); Navam Welihinda (CFO); Chetan Puttagunta (Chairman)
- Products: Search technology; Cybersecurity tools; Big data tools; VectorDB; Retrieval Augmented Generation (RAG)
- Revenue: ▲US$608 million (2021)
- Operating income: ▲US$−129 million (2021)
- Net income: ▲US$−129 million (2021)
- Total assets: ▲US$973 million (2021)
- Total equity: ▲US$451 million (2021)
- Number of employees: 3,403 (2025)
- Website: www.elastic.co

Elastic is a Dutch-American software company that provides a platform for enterprise search, observability, and cybersecurity. Its product enables users to search and analyze large-scale data, monitor system performance, and detect anomalies. Originally known as Elasticsearch, the company was founded in 2012 in Amsterdam, Netherlands, and has maintained its operational headquarters in both the Netherlands and San Francisco, California, US. Elastic is publicly traded on the New York Stock Exchange under the symbol ESTC.

== History ==
In 2004, Shay Banon developed a recipe software application for his wife, who was studying at Le Cordon Bleu. He built Elasticsearch in 2009 and spent three years developing the product along with the open-source community. In 2012, he co-founded the company Elasticsearch with Simon Willnauer, Steven Schuurman, and Uri Boness.

After the company acquired Found in 2015, the company rebranded as Elastic. While the company had been informally referred to as Elastic since its inception, it was not its official name.

In November 2022, Elastic NV laid off 13% of its workforce.

In June 2026, 7% of the global workforce was laid off.

== Products and services ==
Software developed by the company includes Elasticsearch, Kibana, Beats, and Logstash. As a stack, these have been referred to by the company as the Elastic Stack or ELK Stack.

The company also offers Elastic Cloud as an SaaS, and Elastic Cloud Enterprise (ECE).

Elasticsearch technology is used by eBay, Wikipedia, Yelp, Uber, Lyft, Tinder, and Netflix.

The company also offers Search AI Lake and related services to provide ElasticSearch services for large data lakes.

== Corporate information ==
Ordinary shares are listed on the New York Stock Exchange (“NYSE”) under the trading symbol “ESTC.”

The company is headquartered in Amsterdam, the Netherlands.

== Acquisitions ==
- In 2015, the company, then known as Elastisearch, acquired Found, a cloud-based search provider.
- In 2016, Elastic acquired Prelert, a machine learning company specializing in anomaly detection.
- In 2017, Elastic acquired Swiftype, a provider of search and index software.
- In 2019, Elastic acquired Endgame, an endpoint security provider, for $234 million.
- In 2021, Elastic acquired build.security, a cloud security company focusing on policy definition and enforcement.
- In 2021, Elastic acquired Cmd, a company that provides monitoring and control tools for Linux environments.
- On October 14, 2021 Elastic acquired Optimyze, a cloud computing company based in Zurich.
- In 2025, Elastic acquired Israeli start-up Keep, an open-source AIOps platform that manages alerts and incident response.
- In 2025, Elastic acquired Jina AI.
