= Christopher Ré =

American computer scientist

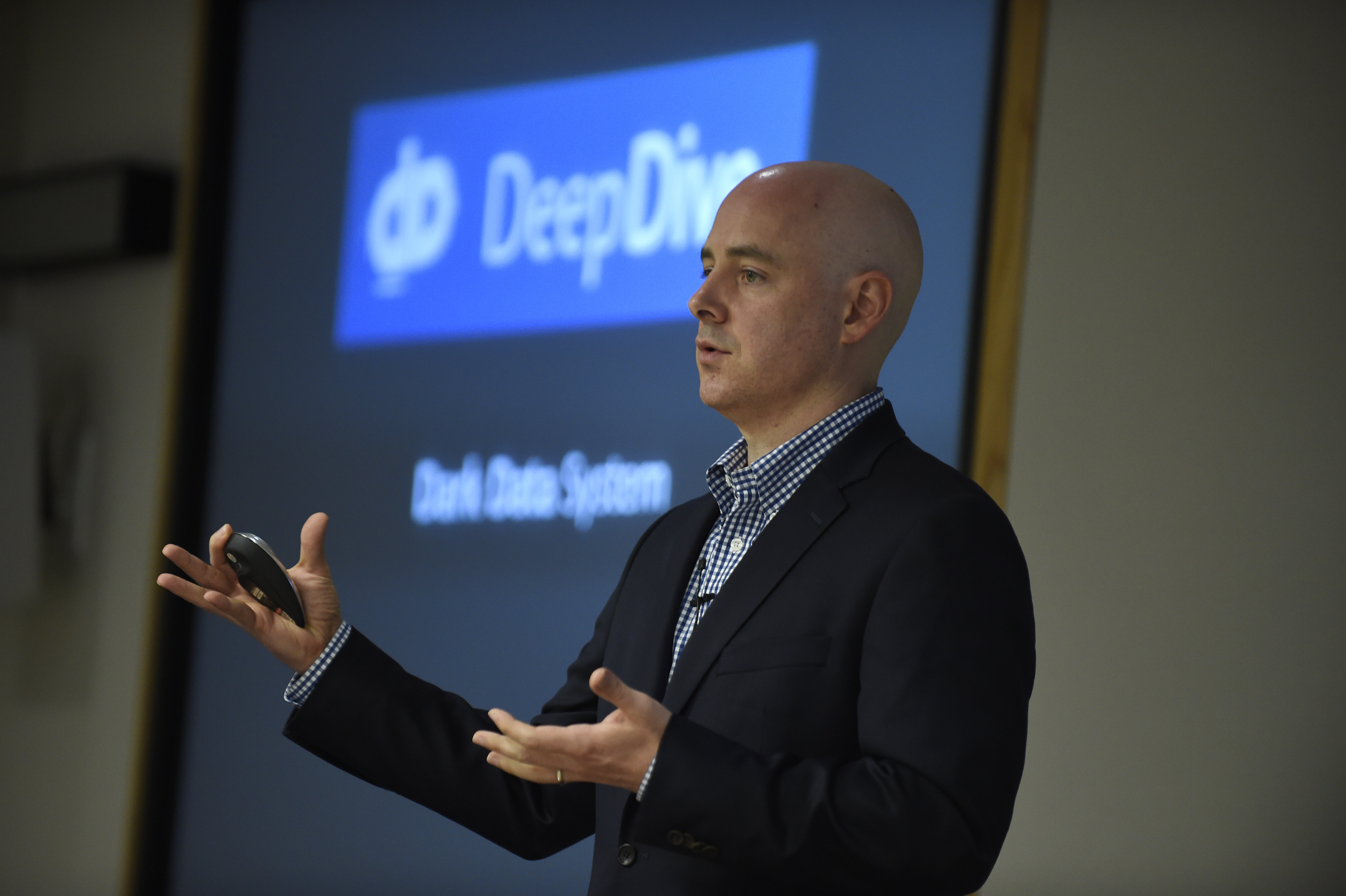
- Education: Cornell University (B.S.); University of Washington at Seattle (Ph.D.)
- Scientific career
- Fields: Computer Science
- Workplaces: Stanford University
- Academic advisors: Dan Suciu

Christopher Ré is an American computer scientist. He is currently employed by Stanford University, where he is a full professor. He was awarded a MacArthur Fellowship in 2015. Ré specializes in big data analysis. He co-founded Lattice.io, a data mining and machine learning company that was acquired by Apple in May 2017.
