= CrateDB =

Distributed SQL database management system

- Developers: Crate.io, Inc.
- Release: April 15, 2013; 13 years ago
- Stable release: 6.4.5 / September 16, 2026; 7 days ago
- Written in: Java
- Operating system: Cross-platform
- Type: Multi-model database Time series database Vector database
- License: Apache License 2.0
- Website: cratedb.com
- Repository: https://github.com/crate/crate

CrateDB is a distributed SQL database management system that integrates a fully searchable document-oriented data store. It is open-source, written in Java, based on a shared-nothing architecture, and designed for high scalability. CrateDB includes components from Trino, Lucene, Elasticsearch and Netty.

== History ==
The CrateDB project was started by Christian Lutz, Bernd Dorn, and Jodok Batlogg in Dornbirn, Austria as an open source, clustered database purposely built for fast text search and analytics.

The company, now called Crate.io, raised its first round of financing in April 2014. In June that year, CrateDB won the judge's choice award at the GigaOm Structure Launchpad competition. In October, CrateDB won the TechCrunch Disrupt Europe in London.

Crate.io closed a $4M founding round in March 2016. In December 2016, CrateDB 1.0 was released having more than one million downloads.

CrateDB 2.0, the first Enterprise Edition of CrateDB, was released in May 2017 after a $2.5M round from Dawn Capital, Draper Esprit, Speedinvest, and Sunstone Capital. In June 2021 Crate.io announced another $10M funding round.
