= WebCite =

On-demand archiving service

- Available in: English
- Owner: University of Toronto
- Creator: Gunther Eysenbach
- Website: WebCitation.org
- Commercial: No
- Launched: 1997; 29 years ago
- Current status: View historical archives only, no new archives

WebCite is an intermittently available archive site, originally designed to digitally preserve scientific and educationally important material on the web by taking snapshots of Internet contents as they existed at the time when a blogger or a scholar cited or quoted from it. The preservation service enabled verifiability of claims supported by the cited sources even when the original web pages are being revised, removed, or disappear for other reasons, an effect known as link rot.

As of June 2023, the site no longer accepts new archive requests; old archive snapshots can still be viewed.

The site is frequently offline with no explanation, and for lengthy periods of time. For example it was offline between October 29, 2021 and June 24, 2023 (1 year and 8 months) during which it reported "DB Connection failed". The site is owned and maintained by Gunther Eysenbach.

== Service features ==
WebCite allowed for preservation of all types of web content, including HTML web pages, PDF files, style sheets, JavaScript and digital images. It also archived metadata about the collected resources such as access time, MIME type, and content length.

WebCite was a non-profit consortium supported by publishers and editors, and it could be used by individuals without charge. It was one of the first services to offer on-demand archiving of pages, a feature later adopted by many other archiving services, such as archive.today and the Wayback Machine. It did not do web page crawling.

== History ==
Conceived in 1997 by Gunther Eysenbach, WebCite was publicly described the following year when an article on Internet quality control declared that such a service could also measure the citation impact of web pages. In the next year, a pilot service was set up at the address webcite.net. Although it seemed that the need for WebCite decreased when Google's short term copies of web pages began to be offered by Google Cache and the Internet Archive expanded their crawling (which started in 1996), WebCite was the only one allowing "on-demand" archiving by users. WebCite also offered interfaces to scholarly journals and publishers to automate the archiving of cited links. By 2008, over 200 journals had begun routinely using WebCite.

WebCite was formerly a member of the International Internet Preservation Consortium. In 2012, responding to a comment on Twitter about WebCite being no longer a consortium member, Eysenbach wrote: "WebCite has no funding, and IIPC charges €4000 per year in annual membership fees."

WebCite "feeds its content" to other digital preservation projects, including the Internet Archive. Lawrence Lessig, an American academic who writes extensively on copyright and technology, used WebCite in his amicus brief in the Supreme Court of the United States case of MGM Studios, Inc. v. Grokster, Ltd.

Sometime between July 9 and 17, 2019, WebCite stopped accepting new archiving requests. In a further outage, between about October 29, 2021 and June 24, 2023, no archived content was available, only the main page worked.

== Fundraising ==
WebCite ran a fund-raising campaign using FundRazr from January 2013 with a target of $22,500, a sum which its operators stated was needed to maintain and modernize the service beyond the end of 2013. This includes relocating the service to Amazon EC2 cloud hosting and legal support. As of 2013 it remained undecided whether WebCite would continue as a non-profit or as a for-profit entity.

== Business model ==
The term "WebCite" is a registered trademark. WebCite did not charge individual users, journal editors and publishers any fee to use their service. WebCite earned revenue from publishers who wanted to "have their publications analyzed and cited webreferences archived". Early support was from the University of Toronto.

== Copyright issues ==
WebCite maintained the legal position that its archiving activities are allowed by the copyright doctrines of fair use and implied license. To support the fair use argument, WebCite noted that its archived copies are transformative, socially valuable for academic research, and not harmful to the market value of any copyrighted work. WebCite argued that caching and archiving web pages was not considered a copyright infringement when the archiver offers the copyright owner an opportunity to "opt-out" of the archive system, thus creating an implied license. To that end, WebCite would not archive in violation of Web site "do-not-cache" and "no-archive" metadata, as well as robot exclusion standards, the absence of which creates an "implied license" for web archive services to preserve the content.

In a similar case involving Google's web caching activities, on January 19, 2006, the United States District Court for the District of Nevada agreed with that argument in the case of Field v. Google (CV-S-04-0413-RCJ-LRL), holding that fair use and an "implied license" meant that Google's caching of Web pages did not constitute copyright violation. The "implied license" referred to general Internet standards.

=== DMCA requests ===
According to their policy, after receiving legitimate DMCA requests from the copyright holders, WebCite would remove saved pages from public access, as the archived pages are still under the safe harbor of being citations. The pages were removed to a "dark archive" and in cases of legal controversies or evidence requests, there was pay-per-view access of "$200 (up to 5 snapshots) plus $100 for each further 10 snapshots" to the copyrighted content.

== See also ==
- Archive.today
- Perma.cc
- Wayback Machine
