= Archive (disambiguation) =

An archive is a collection of historical records.

Archive, The Archive, or Archives may also refer to:

== Librarianship and computing ==
- Archives, a scholarly journal of the British Records Association
- arXiv (pronounced "archive"), an online archive of scientific papers
- The Internet Archive, a large digital library
- Web archiving, the process of archiving the World Wide Web
  - The Wayback Machine, an archive of the World Wide Web created by the Internet Archive
  - archive.is, a general purpose archive site
- Archive Corporation, a data storage company active in the 1980s
- Archive bit, a file system attribute used for controlling incremental backups
- Archive file, a computer file combining several files into one
- Archive site, a website that stores information from the World Wide Web
- Archive (formerly X-No-Archive), a standard header field that controls the archiving of Usenet articles
- Archive (magazine), a membership computer magazine for users of the Acorn Archimedes and RISC OS

== Arts and media ==
=== Music ===
==== Groups ====
- Archive (band), a trip-hop/progressive rock band
- Grand Archives, an indie rock band formerly known as Archives

==== Albums ====
- Archive (Cardiacs album), 1989
- Archive (Magnum album), 1993
- Archive (The Specials album), 2001
- Archives (Darkest Hour album), 2006
- The Archive (EP), a 2013 EP by Imagine Dragons
- Archive (311 album), 2015
- Archives, a 1978 box set by Rush
- The Archive, a 2019 EP by Lily Potter

=== Other arts and media ===
- The Archive a defunct scholarly journal of the Center for Creative Photography
- Archive (non-profit publishing organisation), a publishing and research platform based in Berlin
- Archive (film), a 2020 science fiction film directed by Gavin Rothery

== Other uses ==
- Archives station, a Washington Metro station

== See also ==
- List of national archives
- Cache (disambiguation)
- Hoarding (disambiguation)
