= Web archiving =

Preserving history of web pages

Web archiving is the process of collecting, preserving, and providing access to material from the World Wide Web. The aim is to ensure that information is preserved in an archival format for research and the public. Web archivists typically employ automated web crawlers to capture the massive amount of information on the Web.

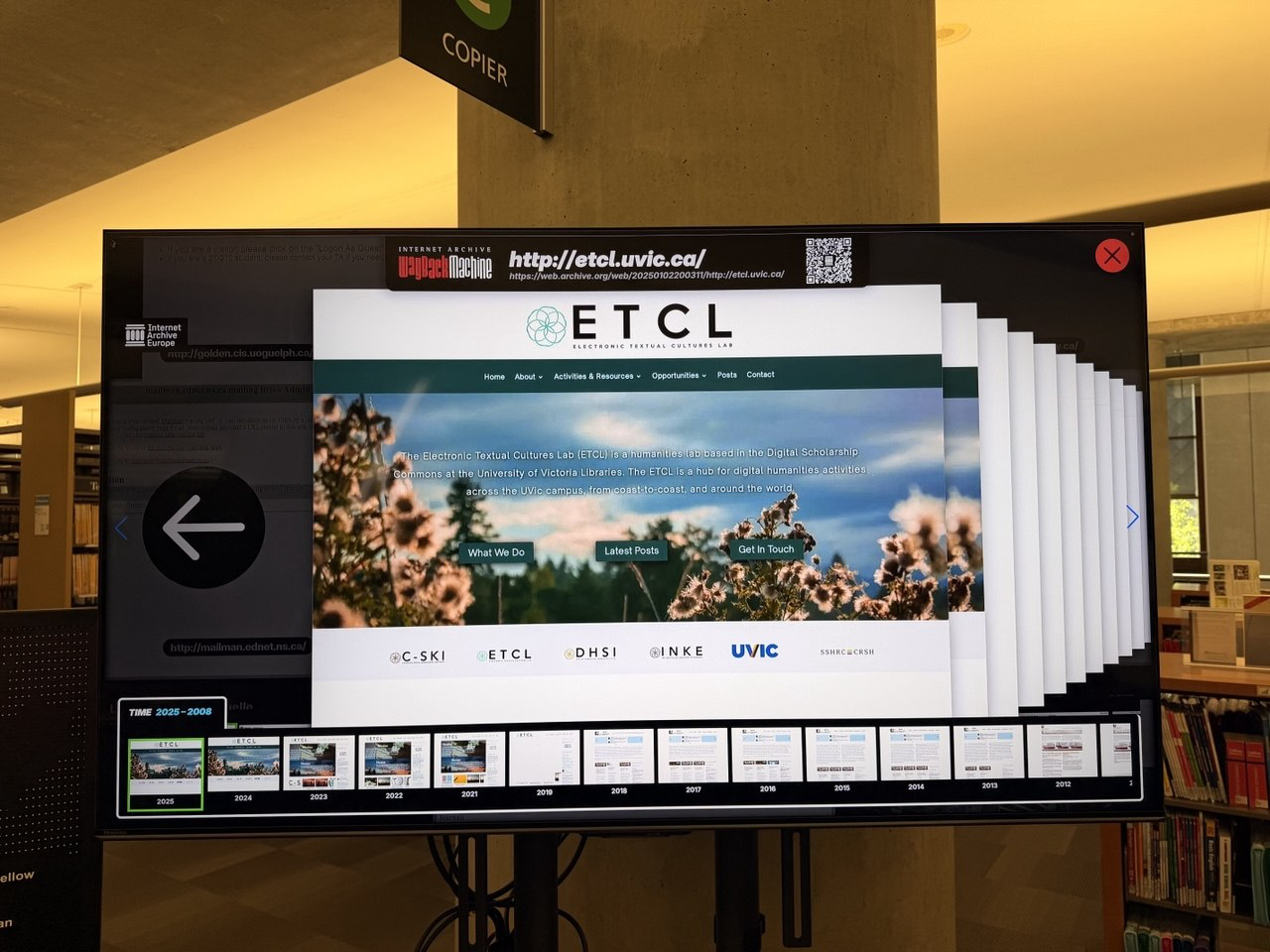
Example of an archived website on the Wayback Machine

The growing portion of human culture created and recorded on the web makes it inevitable that more and more libraries and archives will have to face the challenges of web archiving. A widely known web archive service is the Wayback Machine, run by the Internet Archive. National libraries, national archives, and various consortia of organizations are also involved in archiving Web content to prevent its loss. Commercial web archiving software and services are also available to organizations that need to archive their own web content for corporate heritage, regulatory, or legal purposes.

== History and development ==
While curation and organization of the web have been prevalent since the mid- to late-1990s, one of the first large-scale web archiving projects was the Internet Archive, a non-profit organization created by Brewster Kahle in 1996. The Internet Archive released its own search engine for viewing archived web content, the Wayback Machine, in 2001. As of 2018, the Internet Archive was home to 40 petabytes of data. The Internet Archive also developed many of its own tools for collecting and storing its data, including PetaBox for storing large amounts of data efficiently and safely, and Heritrix, a web crawler developed in conjunction with the Nordic national libraries. Other projects launched around the same time included a web archiving project by the National Library of Canada, Australia's Pandora, Tasmanian web archives and Sweden's Kulturarw3.

From 2001 to 2010, the International Web Archiving Workshop (IWAW) provided a platform to share experiences and exchange ideas. The International Internet Preservation Consortium (IIPC), established in 2003, has facilitated international collaboration in developing standards and open source tools for the creation of web archives.

The now-defunct Internet Memory Foundation was established in 2004 to support web archiving in Europe. This project developed and released many open source tools, such as "rich media capturing, temporal coherence analysis, spam assessment, and terminology evolution detection." The data from the foundation is now housed by the Internet Archive, but not currently publicly accessible.

Despite the fact that there is no centralized responsibility for its preservation, web content is rapidly becoming the official record. For example, in 2017, the United States Department of Justice affirmed that the government treats the President's tweets as official statements.

== Methods of collection ==
Web archivists generally archive various types of web content including HTML web pages, style sheets, JavaScript, images, and video. They also archive metadata about the collected resources such as access time, MIME type, and content length. This metadata is useful in establishing authenticity and provenance of the archived collection.

=== Transactional archiving ===
Transactional archiving is an event-driven approach, which collects the actual transactions which take place between a web server and a web browser. It is primarily used to preserve evidence of the content viewed on a particular website, on a given date. This may be particularly important for organizations which need to comply with legal or regulatory requirements for disclosing and retaining information.

A transactional archiving system typically operates by intercepting every HTTP request to, and response from, the web server, filtering each response to eliminate duplicate content, and permanently storing the responses as bitstreams.

== Difficulties and limitations ==
=== Crawlers ===
Web archives which rely on web crawling as their primary means of collecting the Web are influenced by the difficulties of web crawling:

- The robots exclusion protocol may request crawlers not access portions of a website. Some web archivists may ignore the request and crawl those portions anyway.
- Large portions of a website may be hidden in the Deep Web. For example, the results page behind a web form can lie in the Deep Web if crawlers cannot follow a link to the results page.
- Crawler traps (e.g., calendars) may cause a crawler to download an infinite number of pages, so crawlers are usually configured to limit the number of dynamic pages they crawl.
- Many web archiving tools do not capture pages exactly as they appear in the browser. Advertisements and images, for example, may be omitted during archiving.

However, a native format web archive, i.e., a fully browsable web archive, with working links, media, etc., is only really possible using crawler technology.

The Web is so large that crawling a significant portion of it takes a large number of technical resources. Also, the Web is changing so fast that portions of a website may change before a crawler has even finished crawling it.

=== General limitations ===
nSome web servers are configured to return different pages to web archiver requests than they would in response to regular browser requests. This is typically done to fool search engines into directing more user traffic to a website and is often done to avoid accountability or to provide enhanced content only to those browsers that can display it.

Not only must web archivists deal with the technical challenges of web archiving, they must also contend with intellectual property laws. Peter Lyman states that "although the Web is popularly regarded as a public domain resource, it is copyrighted; thus, archivists have no legal right to copy the Web". However, national libraries in some countries have a legal right to copy portions of the web under legal deposit provisions.

Some private non-profit web archives that are made publicly accessible like WebCite, the Internet Archive or the Internet Memory Foundation allow content owners to hide or remove archived content that they do not want the public to have access to. Other web archives are only accessible from certain locations or have regulated usage. WebCite cites a recent lawsuit against Google's caching, which Google won.

== Laws ==
In 2017 the Financial Industry Regulatory Authority, Inc. (FINRA), a United States financial regulatory organization, released a notice stating all the businesses doing digital communications are required to keep a record. This includes website data, social media posts, and messages. Some copyright laws may inhibit Web archiving. For instance, academic archiving by Sci-Hub falls outside the bounds of contemporary copyright law. The site provides enduring access to academic works including those that do not have an open access license and thereby contributes to the archival of scientific research which may otherwise be lost.

== See also ==
- Anna's Archive
- Archive site
- Archive Team
- archive.today (formerly archive.is)
- Collective memory
- Common Crawl
- Digital hoarding
- Digital preservation
- Digital library
- Ghost Archive
- Google Cache
- List of Web archiving initiatives
- Memento Project
- Minerva Initiative
- Mirror website
- National Digital Information Infrastructure and Preservation Program (NDIIPP)
- National Digital Library Program (NDLP)
- PADICAT
- PageFreezer
- Pandora Archive
- UK Web Archive
- Virtual artifact
- Wayback Machine
- Web crawling
- WebCite
- Webrecorder

== General bibliography ==
- Brown, A. (2006). Archiving Websites: A Practical Guide for Information Management Professionals. London: Facet Publishing. ISBN 978-1-85604-553-7.
- Brügger, N. (2005). Archiving Websites. General Considerations and Strategies. Aarhus: The Centre for Internet Research. ISBN 978-87-990507-0-3. Archived from the original on January 29, 2009.
- Day, M. (2003). "Preserving the Fabric of Our Lives: A Survey of Web Preservation Initiatives" (PDF). Research and Advanced Technology for Digital Libraries. Lecture Notes in Computer Science. Vol. 2769. pp. 461–472. doi:10.1007/978-3-540-45175-4_42. ISBN 978-3-540-40726-3. Archived (PDF) from the original on October 29, 2023.
- Eysenbach, G. & Trudel, M. (2005). "Going, going, still there: using the WebCite service to permanently archive cited web pages". Journal of Medical Internet Research. 7 (5) e60. doi:10.2196/jmir.7.5.e60. PMC 1550686. PMID 16403724.
- Fitch, Kent (2003). "Web site archiving—an approach to recording every materially different response produced by a website". Ausweb 03. Archived from the original on July 20, 2003.
- Jacoby, Robert (August 19, 2010). "Archiving a Web Page". seoq.com. Archived from the original on January 3, 2011.
- Lyman, Peter (2002). "Archiving the World Wide Web". Building a National Strategy for Preservation: Issues in Digital Media Archiving (PDF). Council on Library and Information Resources. pp. 38–51. ISBN 978-1-887334-91-4.
- Masanès, J., ed. (2006). Web Archiving. Berlin: Springer-Verlag. ISBN 978-3-540-23338-1.
- Pennock, Maureen (2013). Web-Archiving. DPC Technology Watch Reports. Great Britain: Digital Preservation Coalition. doi:10.7207/twr13-01. ISSN 2048-7916.
- Toyoda, M.; Kitsuregawa, M. (2012). "The History of Web Archiving". Proceedings of the IEEE. 100 (special centennial issue): 1441–1443. doi:10.1109/JPROC.2012.2189920.
