= Archivist (disambiguation) =

An archivist is an information worker who works in archives. It may also refer to:

- Archivist (band), a post-metal band formed in 2014
- The Archivist, a 1998 novel by Martha Cooley
- Archivist, a Dungeon & Dragons character class
- The Archivist of the United States

== See also ==
- Archive (disambiguation)
