= Field v. Google, Inc. =

2006 American copyright infringement case

Field v. Google, Inc., 412 F.Supp. 2d 1106 (D. Nev. 2006) is a case where Google Inc. successfully defended a lawsuit for copyright infringement. Field argued that Google infringed his exclusive right to reproduce his copyrighted works when it "cached" his website and made a copy of it available on its search engine. Google raised multiple defenses: fair use, implied license, estoppel, and Digital Millennium Copyright Act safe harbor protection. The court granted Google's motion for summary judgment and denied Field's motion for summary judgment.

== Background ==
The plaintiff, Blake Field, is an attorney, author, and member of the State bar association of Nevada. On April 6, 2004, Field filed a complaint against Google asserting a single claim for copyright infringement due to Google's alleged copying and distributing one of his works (Good Tea) that he had previously published on his personal homepage, www.blakeswriting.com. On May 25, 2004, Field filed an Amended Complaint, stating that Google had infringed on an additional 50 works published by Field on his personal website.

Field sought $2,550,000 in statutory damages ($50,000 for each of the 51 registered copyrighted works) in conjunction with injunctive relief.

The defendant, Google, operates a popular search engine. To enable users to search billions of websites, Google uses an automated program called the "Googlebot." This program crawls the internet looking for new sites to include in its index. Once a site is found the Googlebot creates a "cached" version of the site. The cached version is then included in the search results of its search engine. When a user clicks the link to the cached version, the user can view a "snapshot" of the page as it appeared at the time the Googlebot found the site.

Website creators have the option of preventing the Googlebot from indexing their sites by including a simple code in the HTML. In addition, websites can include code that allows the site to be included in Google's index, but that prevents Google from caching the website.

Field had actual knowledge of the Googlebot. He also was aware of the ways to prevent Google from either listing his site at all or listing it but not providing a link to the cached version. Instead of opting out, however, he chose to allow Google to both index and provide a link to the cached version.

== Ruling ==
The District Court, Jones, J., held that:

1. Operator did not directly infringe on author's copyrighted works;
2. Author granted operator implied license to display "cached" links to web pages containing his copyrighted works;
3. Author was estopped from asserting copyright infringement claim against operator;
4. Fair use doctrine protected operator's use of author's works; and
5. Search engine fell within protection of safe harbor provision of Digital Millennium Copyright Act (DMCA).

Summary judgment for operator.

The court held that "Field decided to manufacture a claim for copyright infringement against Google in the hopes of making money from Google's standard practice." The court then went on to rule in Google's favor on all of its defense theories.

=== Direct infringement ===
The court relied on two prior cases (Religious Technology Center v. Netcom On-Line Communication Services, Inc. and CoStar Group, Inc. v. LoopNet, Inc.) and held that "volitional conduct on the part of the defendant" is required for a showing of direct infringement. In this case, "Google is passive in the process", and "Google's computers respond automatically to the user's request." Thus, there was no volitional conduct on Google's behalf and hence no direct infringement.

=== Implied license ===
Courts usually do not require a copyright holder to affirmatively take steps to prevent infringement. In this case, however, the court found that the plaintiff had granted Google an implied, nonexclusive license to display the work because of Field's failure in using meta tags to prevent his site from being cached by Google. This could reasonably be interpreted as a grant of a license for that use and so the courts held that a license for Google to cache the site was implied because Field failed to take the necessary steps when setting up his website.

=== Estoppel ===
The court invoked the facts supporting its finding of an implied license to support and reiterate that Field could have prevented the caching, did not do so, and allowed Google to detrimentally rely on the absence of metatags. Had Google known the defendant's objection to displaying cached versions of its website, it would not have done so.

=== Fair use ===
The court applied the 4 statutory factors from 17 U.S.C. 107 and held that Google's caching was fair use. The first factor, "the purpose and character of the use" weighed in Google's favor. The court stated that Google's use was transformative and did not merely supersede Field's use. The court explained that Field's use was to enrich the lives of others through poetry, while Google's use was to facilitate the operation of search engines. The court identified multiple characteristics that distinguished Google's use from Field's including:

1. Google's use is for archival purposes;
2. Google's use allows users to track changes in websites;
3. Google's use allows users to figure out why a particular page resulted from a search.

The court further held that Google's commercial status was of little importance because the Google's use was transformative.

The second factor, "the nature of the copyrighted works", also weighed in favor of Google because the works were available for free on Field's website.

The third factor, "the amount and substantiality of the use", weighed equally for both parties. Although Google cached the entire website, the fact that Field made the works available on his website and the difference in the use of the two made this factor neutral.

The fourth factor, "the effect of the use upon the potential market for or value of the copyrighted work", weighed in favor of Google. There was no market for Field's works and the caching did not impact any potential market for his works.

The court considered an additional factor, "Google's good faith in operating its system cache," which favored fair use. Google used industry standard procedures that allowed website operators to prevent caching. Google promptly removed the caches to Field's work when it learned that Field did not want them.

=== DMCA safe harbor ===
Finally, the court held that Google qualified for the DMCA safe harbor provisions of the 1998 Digital Millennium Copyright Act (DMCA), which states that "[a] service provider shall not be liable for monetary relief . . . for infringement of copyright by reason of the intermediate and temporary storage of material on a system or network controlled or operated by or for the service provider."
