= Search engine cache =

Cache of web pages

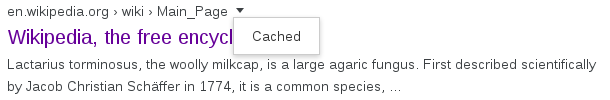
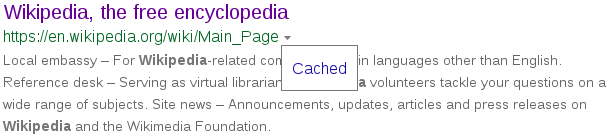
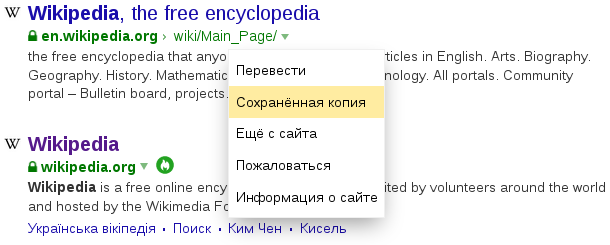
The link for the cached version of a web page in search results from Google (top), Bing (middle) and Yandex (bottom)

A search engine cache is a cache of web pages that shows the page as it was when it was indexed by a web crawler. Cached versions of web pages can be used to view the contents of a page when the live version cannot be reached, has been altered or taken down.

A web crawler collects the contents of a web page, which is then indexed by a web search engine. The search engine might make the copy accessible to users. Web crawlers that obey restrictions in robots.txt or meta tags by the site webmaster may not make a cached copy available to search engine users if instructed not to.

Search engine caches can be used for crime investigation, legal proceedings and journalism. They may not be fully protected by the usual laws that protect technology providers from copyright infringement claims.

== Google Cache ==
Google retired its web caching service on February 2, 2024. The service was designed for websites that might show up in a Google search result, but are temporarily offline. As a "cache", it was not designed for archival purposes, the cache had expiration. Google said the Internet as of 2024 is much more reliable than it was "way back" in earlier days, and therefore its cache service is no longer an important service to maintain.

Google pointed to the Wayback Machine as a better alternative, and suggested Google might work with them in the future. In September 2024, Google and the Internet Archive announced a collaboration providing links to the Wayback Machine from within Google Search.

== Bing Search ==
Bing Search, following Google Cache's lead, also retired its web caching service on December 11, 2024. Microsoft explained, "the internet has evolved for better reliability, and many pages aren't optimized for cache viewing."

== Yahoo Search ==
Yahoo Search began offering a cache service in May 2011. After Google Cache was eliminated in early 2024, PC Mag reported that alternative sites Bing and Yahoo Search were still available for caching. It noted that as long as Bing cache worked, Yahoo Search would also, since Microsoft Bing is the crawling service for Yahoo. Bing cache ceased working in late 2024, and Yahoo Cache buttons are no longer available. There was no official announcement from Yahoo about the cache service being eliminated.
