= Archive site =

Website that stores information on webpages from the past

In web archiving, an archive site is a website that stores information on webpages from the past for anyone to view.

== Common techniques ==
Two common techniques for archiving websites are using a web crawler or soliciting user submissions:

1. Using a web crawler: By using a web crawler (e.g., the Internet Archive) the service will not depend on an active community for its content, and thereby can build a larger database faster. However, web crawlers are only able to index and archive information the public has chosen to post to the Internet, or that is available to be crawled, as website developers and system administrators have the ability to block web crawlers from accessing [certain] web pages (using a robots.txt).
2. User submissions: While it can be difficult to start user submission services due to potentially low rates of user submissions, this system can yield some of the best results. By crawling web pages one is only able to obtain the information the public has chosen to post online; however, potential content providers may not bother to post certain information, assuming no one would be interested in it, because they lack a proper venue in which to post it, or because of copyright concerns. However, users who see someone wants their information may be more apt to submit it.

== Examples ==
=== Google Groups ===
On 12 February 2001, Google acquired the usenet discussion group archives from Deja.com and turned it into their Google Groups service. They allow users to search old discussions with Google's search technology, while still allowing users to post to the mailing lists.

=== Internet Archive ===
The Internet Archive is building a compendium of websites and digital media. Starting in 1996, the Archive has been employing a web crawler to build up their database. It is one of the best known archive sites.

=== NBCUniversal Archives ===
NBCUniversal Archives offer access to exclusive content from NBCUniversal and its subsidiaries. Their NBCUniversal Archives website includes both past and recent news clips.

=== PANDORA Archive ===
PANDORA (Pandora Archive), founded in 1996 by the National Library of Australia, stands for Preserving and Accessing Networked Documentary Resources of Australia, which encapsulates their mission. They provide a long-term catalog of select online publications and web sites authored by Australians or that are of an Australian topic. They employ their PANDAS (PANDORA Digital Archiving System) when building their catalog.

=== textfiles.com ===
textfiles.com is a large library of old text files maintained by Jason Scott Sadofsky. Its mission is to archive the old documents that had floated around the bulletin board systems (BBS) of his youth and to document other people's experiences on the bulletin board systems.

== See also ==
- Internet Archive
- Pandora Archive
- WebCite
- Web archiving
