= Really Simple Licensing =

Open content licensing standard

- Abbreviation: RSL
- First published: September 10, 2025
- Organization: RSL Collective
- Website: rslstandard.org

Really Simple Licensing (RSL) is an open content licensing standard that allows web publishers to set terms for web crawlers gathering training data for generative AI use. It was launched on September 10, 2025 and is managed by the nonprofit RSL Collective, co-founded by RSS co-creator Eckart Walther and former Ask.com CEO Doug Leeds. Participating companies at launch include Reddit, Yahoo, and Medium.

Publishers can implement the RSL standard by adding licensing terms to their robots.txt files.

== See also ==
- robots.txt
