= Spambot =

Computer spam program (malware)

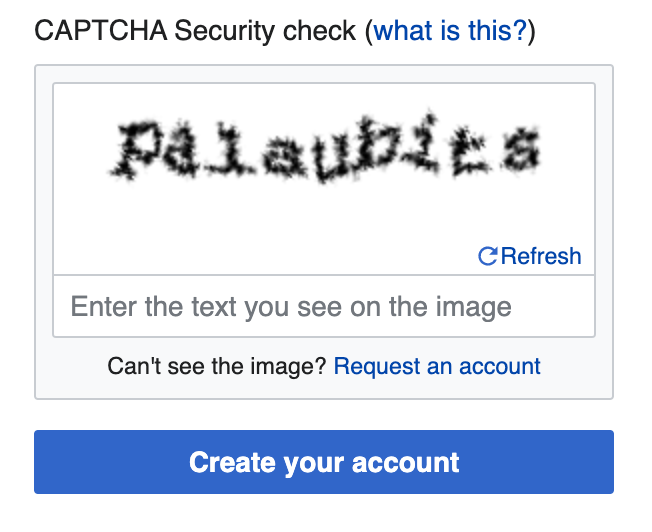
A CAPTCHA challenge, a common type of countermeasure against spam, hosted on Wikipedia

A spambot is a computer program designed to facilitate spam. Spambots create accounts and usually send unsolicited messages to other users. Web hosts and website operators have banned spammers, resulting in an ongoing battle as spammers try to circumvent bans and anti-spam measures, while hosts work to prevent these tactics.

== Email ==
Email spambots are web crawlers that collect email addresses from websites, newsgroups, special-interest group (SIG) postings, and chat-room conversations to create mailing lists for sending unsolicited emails, known as email spam. They are programmed to recognize the format of email addresses, making it easy for them to gather this information.

Various methods have been developed to combat spambots, including address munging. This technique involves intentionally altering an email address to make it readable to humans or human-controlled web browsers, while preventing spambots from interpreting it. This has led to the development of advanced spambots that can extract email addresses from munged character strings or scrape them from text rendered in a web browser. Alternative techniques for displaying email addresses on a web page include using an image, a text logo with inline CSS, or jumbling the characters and rearranging them with CSS for display.

== Forums ==
Forum spambots are automated programs that search the internet for guestbooks, wikis, blogs, forums, and other web forms to submit fake content. These often use OCR technology to bypass CAPTCHAs. Some spam messages are targeted towards readers and may involve techniques such as target marketing or phishing, making it difficult to distinguish between genuine posts and bot-generated ones. Spam messages are often posted to increase the number of links to a website and improve its search engine ranking, rather than for human consumption.

To prevent spambots from creating automated posts, requiring users to confirm their intention to post via email can be an effective measure. Spambot scripts often use fake email addresses, making it unlikely for them to receive and respond to an email confirmation request. Some spambots can bypass this step by providing a valid email address for validation, often using webmail services. Security questions can help prevent spam generated by spambots during registration. Consistent posting of spam on forums may result in the user being labeled as a "spambot".

== See also ==
- Anti-spam techniques – Methods to prevent email spam
- Botnet – Collection of compromised internet-connected devices controlled by a third party
- Dead Internet theory – Concept involving online bot activity
- List poisoning – Anti-spam technique
- Rustock botnet – Type of botnet
- Social bot – Software agent that communicates on social media
- Spamtrap – Honeypot used to collect spam
- Spider trap – Set of web pages that can undermine web crawlers
- Votebots – Automation used to participate in polls, elections, and social media
