= Shop right =

Concept in United States patent law

Shop right, in United States patent law, is an implied license under which a firm may use a patented invention, invented by an employee who was working within the scope of their employment, using the firms' equipment, or inventing at the firms' expense. Even if the employee never assigned rights to the firm, a court of law may find that the firm has the right to make use of the invention, and thus can not be sued by the employee for patent infringement. This will allow the firm to attempt to capitalize on the value of the patent, as the firm is allowed to use the object of the patent in the routine operation of its business without royalty payments. Shop right is non-transferable. It only inures to the benefit of the employer and can not be sold by that employer to an unrelated party, except in a sale of the business as a whole.

In circumstances where a written agreement is not in place between employer and employee, the employee may hold title to the intellectual property rights as an inventor. In these circumstances, a shop right may apply. The shop right is a common law doctrine founded in equitable principles that allows an employer to use the employee's invention without payment to the employee if that invention was made using the employer's time, materials, facilities, or equipment. Unfortunately for employers, shop rights, being an equitable right, are non-transferable, so an employer holding shop rights may not transfer those rights via license or assignment. For example, if the employer were acquired, the rights would not transfer. Accordingly, this makes having only shop rights an undesirable position for most employers.

However, compare this to the "hired to invent" doctrine, which is a state-law specific doctrine that may provide chain of title to the employer. In instances where there is no written agreement between employer and employee as to patent rights, the "hired to invent" doctrine may save an otherwise unprepared employer. Of course, absent an assignment, employment agreement, or other written document, the employee presumptively owns any inventions, even those developed during the course of employment. This rule comes as a surprise to many business owners and even some attorneys. The "hired to invent" doctrine is embedded in contract law, so state law applies when adjudicating the "hired to invent" doctrine.
