= SortSite =

Internet bot

- Developer: PowerMapper Software
- Stable release: 2026.61 / August 6, 2026
- Operating system: Microsoft Windows, macOS
- Type: Web crawler
- License: EULA
- Website: http://www.powermapper.com/

SortSite is a web crawler that scans entire websites for quality issues including accessibility, browser compatibility, broken links, legal compliance, search optimization, usability and web standards compliance.

== Tests, standards and checkpoints ==
Quality tests run on each page include:

- Accessibility - W3C WCAG 2.2, Section 508 and EN 301 549 standards
- Browser compatibility - check cross-browser compatibility of HTML, CSS and JavaScript (i.e. find code that doesn't work in all browsers)
- Broken links - checks for broken links, missing images and HTTP protocol violations
- Search engine guidelines - Bing, DuckDuckGo and Google guidelines
- Usability - best practice web usability guidelines
- Web standards - validation of HTML and CSS

== Reviews ==
The product has been reviewed in Website Magazine and Softpedia News. The vendor maintains a list of current reviews on their website.

A list of problems commonly encountered by users is provided by the vendor in the "SortSite FAQ" on its website.

== Licensing ==
SortSite is commercial licensed software which uses serial numbers to prevent unlicensed usage. Standard licensing is per-user, but pooled floating licences are also available at extra cost.

== See also ==
- Cross-browser compatibility, making websites work in all browsers
- Web accessibility, making websites available to people of all abilities and disabilities
- Web usability, making websites easier to use
