= Bingbot =

Web crawler used by Microsoft Bing

- Original author: Microsoft
- Type: Web crawler
- Website: Bingbot FAQ

Bingbot is a web-crawling robot (type of internet bot), deployed by Microsoft October 2010 to supply Bing. It collects documents from the web to build a searchable index for the Bing search engine. It performs the same as Google's Googlebot.

== Behavior ==
A typical user agent string for Bingbot is "Mozilla/5.0 (compatible; bingbot/2.0; +http://www.bing.com/bingbot.htm)". This appears in the web server logs to tell the webmaster who is requesting a file. Each webmaster is able to use the included agent identifier, "bingbot", to disallow or allow access to their site (by default access is allowed). If they don't want to grant access, they can use robots.txt to block it (relying on the assumed good behaviour of bingbot), or use other server specific means (relying on the web server to do the blocking).
