= Filippo Menczer =

American and Italian computer scientist

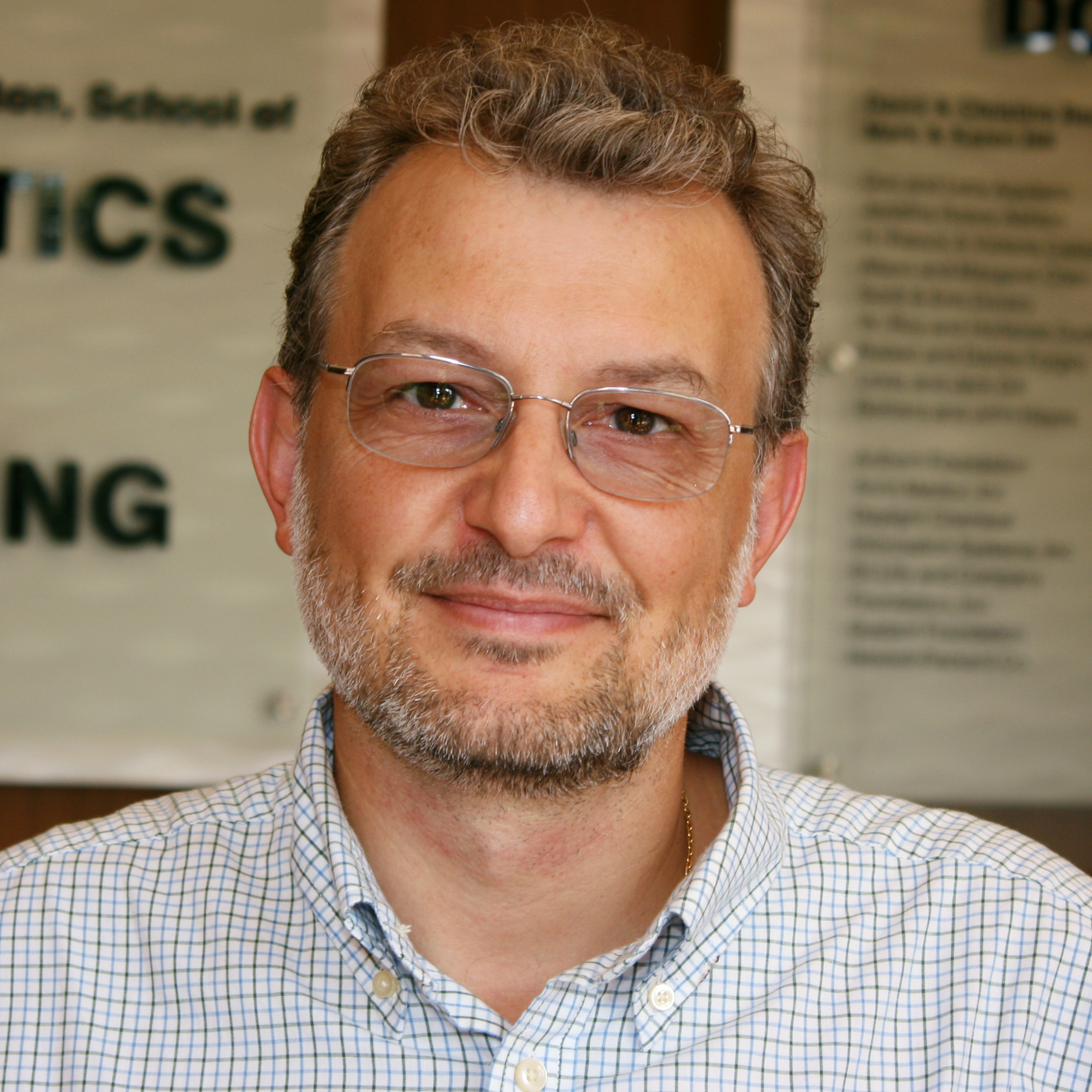
- Born: 16 May 1965 (age 61); Rome, Italy
- Education: Sapienza University of Rome; University of California, San Diego
- Known for: Web crawlers, Social bots, Astroturfing, Fake news, Misinformation
- Parent: Erico Menczer
- Awards: ACM Fellow, AAAS Fellow, AAAI ICWSM Test of Time Award
- Scientific career
- Fields: Cognitive science Computer science Physics
- Workplaces: Indiana University Bloomington
- Website: cnets.indiana.edu/fil/

Filippo Menczer (born 16 May 1965) is an American and Italian academic. He is a University Distinguished Professor and the Luddy Professor of Informatics and Computer Science at the Luddy School of Informatics, Computing, and Engineering of Indiana University. Menczer is the Director of the Observatory on Social Media, a research center where data scientists and journalists study the role of media and technology in society and build tools to analyze and counter disinformation and manipulation on social media. Menczer holds courtesy appointments in Cognitive Science and Physics, is a former director of the Center for Complex Networks and Systems Research, a senior research fellow of the Kinsey Institute, a fellow of the Center for Computer-Mediated Communication, and a former fellow of the Institute for Scientific Interchange in Turin, Italy. He was named an ACM Fellow in 2020 and AAAS Fellow in 2024.

== Education, career, service ==
Menczer holds a Laurea in physics from the Sapienza University of Rome and a PhD in computer science and cognitive science from the University of California, San Diego. He used to be an assistant professor of management sciences at the University of Iowa, and a fellow-at-large of the Santa Fe Institute. At Indiana University Bloomington since 2003, he served as division chair in the Luddy School in 2009–2011. Menczer has been the recipient of Fulbright, Rotary Foundation, and NATO fellowships, and a CAREER Award from the National Science Foundation. He holds editorial positions for the journals Network Science, EPJ Data Science, PeerJ Computer Science, and HKS Misinformation Review. He has served as program or track chair for various conferences including The Web Conference and the ACM Conference on Hypertext and Social Media. He was general chair of the ACM Web Science 2014 Conference and general co-chair of the NetSci 2017 Conference.

== Research ==
Menczer's research focuses on Web science, social networks, social media, social computation, Web mining, data science, distributed and intelligent Web applications, and modeling of complex information networks. He introduced the idea of topical and adaptive Web crawlers, a specialized and intelligent type of Web crawler.

Menczer is also known for his work on social phishing, a type of phishing attacks that leverage friendship information from social networks, yielding over 70% success rate in experiments (with Markus Jakobsson); semantic similarity measures for information and social networks; models of complex information and social networks (with Alessandro Vespignani and others); search engine censorship; and search engine bias.

The group led by Menczer has analyzed and modeled how memes, information, and misinformation spread through social media in domains such as the Occupy movement, the Gezi Park protests, and political elections. Data and tools from Menczer's lab have aided in finding the roots of the Pizzagate conspiracy theory and the disinformation campaign targeting the White Helmets, and in taking down voter-suppression bots on Twitter. Menczer and coauthors have also found a link between online COVID-19 misinformation, vaccination hesitancy, and deaths.

Analysis by Menczer's team demonstrated the echo-chamber structure of information-diffusion networks on Twitter during the 2010 United States elections. The team found that conservatives almost exclusively retweeted other conservatives while liberals retweeted other liberals. Ten years later, this work received the Test of Time Award at the 15th International AAAI Conference on Web and Social Media (ICWSM). As these patterns of polarization and segregation persist, Menczer's team has developed a model that shows how social influence and unfollowing accelerate the emergence of online echo chambers.

Menczer and colleagues have advanced the understanding of information virality, and in particular the prediction of what memes will go viral based on the structure of early diffusion networks and how competition for finite attention helps explain virality patterns. In a 2018 paper in Nature Human Behaviour, Menczer and coauthors used a model to show that when agents in a social networks share information under conditions of high information load and/or low attention, the correlation between quality and popularity of information in the system decreases. An erroneous analysis in the paper suggested that this effect alone would be sufficient to explain why fake news are as likely to go viral as legitimate news on Facebook. When the authors discovered the error, they retracted the paper.

Following influential publications on the detection of astroturfing and social bots, Menczer and his team have studied the complex interplay between cognitive, social, and algorithmic factors that contribute to the vulnerability of social media platforms and people to manipulation, and focused on developing tools to counter such abuse. Their bot detection tool, Botometer, was used to assess the prevalence of social bots and their sharing activity. Their tool to visualize the spread of low-credibility content, Hoaxy, was used in conjunction with Botometer to reveal the key role played by social bots in spreading low-credibility content during the 2016 United States presidential election. Menczer's team also studied perceptions of partisan political bots, finding that Republican users are more likely to confuse conservative bots with humans, whereas Democratic users are more likely to confuse conservative human users with bots. Using bot probes on Twitter, Menczer and coauthors demonstrated a conservative political bias on the platform.

As social media have increased their countermeasures against malicious automated accounts, Menczer and coauthors have shown that coordinated campaigns by inauthentic accounts continue to threaten information integrity on social media, and developed a framework to detect these coordinated networks. They also demonstrated new forms of social media manipulation by which bad actors can grow influence networks and hide high-volume of content with which they flood the network. Through modeling, Menczer demonstrated that bad actors can most effectively control the spread of malicious content through a target online community by infiltrating it with inauthentic social media accounts. Menczer and colleagues realized that AI could be weaponized for this purpose by creating fake but credible content at scale and managing hard-to-detect social bots, which they discovered on Twitter/X. These findings led to a warning about malicious swarms of AI agents that can threaten democracy.

Studying social media ranking/recommendation algorithms, Menczer and colleagues have shown that political audience diversity can be used as an indicator of news source reliability. After a high-profile Science paper that suggested Facebook's feed algorithm decreases exposure to misinformation compared to the chronological feed, Menczer co-wrote a letter in Science arguing such a conclusion was unsupported. The original study was carried out around the 2020 U.S. elections, during a period in which Facebook had instituted a series of emergency changes to its algorithm to reduce the spread of misinformation. The reported decrease could have been caused by these temporary changes.

== Textbook ==
The textbook A First Course in Network Science by Menczer, Fortunato, and Davis was published by Cambridge University Press in 2020. The textbook has been translated into Japanese, Chinese, and Korean.

== Projects ==
- Observatory on Social Media (OSoMe, pronounced awesome): A research center aimed to study and visualize how information spreads online. Includes data and tools to visualize Twitter trends, diffusion networks, detect social bots, etc.
- Botometer: A machine learning tool to detect social bots on Twitter. Previously known as BotOrNot. Includes a public API, a social bot dataset repository, and the BotAmp tool to assess the role of automated accounts in boosting a given topic.
- Hoaxy: An open-source search and network visualization tool to study the spread of narratives on Twitter. Includes a public API.
- Fakey: A mobile game for news literacy. Fakey mimics a social media news feed where you have to tell real news from fake ones.
- Scholarometer: A social tool and API to facilitate citation analysis and help evaluate the impact of an author's publications. By crowdsourcing discipline annotations, this browser extension is able to provide a universal metric to compare impact across disciplines.
- Kinsey Reporter: A global mobile survey platform to share, explore, and visualize anonymous data about sex and sexual behaviors. Developed in collaboration with the Kinsey Institute. Reports are submitted via Web or smartphone, then available for visualization or offline analysis via a public API.
