= Votebot =

Automation used to participate in polls, elections, and social media

A votebot is a software automation built to fraudulently participate in online polls, elections, and to upvote and downvote on social media.

Simple votebots are easy to code and deploy, yet they are often effective against many polls online, as the developer of the poll software must take this kind of attack into account and do extra work to defend against it.

== Technique used ==
The WWW uses the HTTP protocol to transfer information. Votebots are designed to imitate legitimate user behaviour, such as voting in an online poll by interacting with the server hosting the poll using the HTTP protocol. The bot thus emulates the behavior of a human using a web browser, but can repeat this emulated behavior many times, thus casting many votes.

== Distinguishing bots from humans ==
In many voting projects, developers try to distinguish bots from legitimate users. For example, some websites restrict the number of votes one IP address can make in a time period. Votebots frequently bypass this rule by using proxy or VPN IP addresses. Other web sites analyze the account created by a votebot and its history of actions in the system to identify potential votebots. Votebots in turn counter this by trying to simulate human activity such as logging in and out before voting. Other sites employ CAPTCHAs, which votebots farm out to Mechanical Turks.

== Targeted sites ==
YouTube, Facebook, Twitter and Reddit are major target of votebots. Many small, temporary voting projects are also targeted. Many people try to program or buy malicious scripts to vote for themselves in some processes, and it is hard to count the number of attacks happening every day.

== See also ==
- Chatterbot
- Dead Internet theory
- IRC bot
- Knowbot
- Spambot
