= Msnbot =

Web crawler used by MSN Search (2004–2010)

Msnbot was a web-crawling robot (type of internet bot), deployed by Microsoft to collect documents from the web to build a searchable index for the MSN Search (and later Microsoft Bing) engine. It went into beta in 2004, and had full public release in 2005. The month of October 2010 saw the official retirement of msnbot from most active web crawling duties and its replacement by bingbot.

As of September 2015, msnbot was still active from the Microsoft and the Bing webmaster help & howto documentation still indicated that msnbot was active (but that it would retire soon). The verification tool for bingbot previously did not recognise msnbot IP addresses. A test executed on 2016-02-22 resulted in a yes: "Verdict for IP address 157.55.39.150: Yes - this IP address is a verified Bingbot IP address. Name: msnbot-157-55-39-150.search.msn.com."
