= Archive (non-profit publishing organisation) =

Non-profit publishing organization

Archive Kabinett
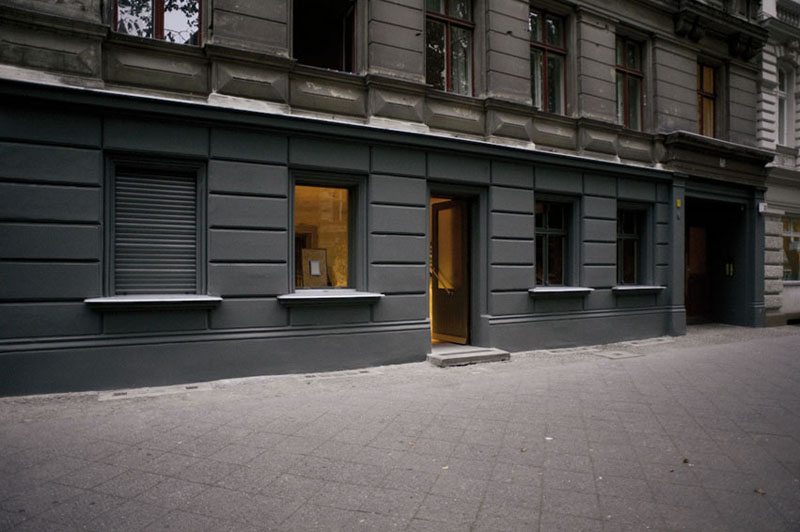
- Established: 2009
- Location: Dieffenbachstrasse 31, 10967 Berlin, Germany
- Founder: Chiara Figone
- Website: www.archivekabinett.org

Archive is a publishing and research platform based in Berlin.

It consists of a publishing house, an exhibition space and a magazine. Its activities are focused on the publishing field and experimentation with editorial formats and concepts. Archive investigates art practices in the context of a larger cultural and social sphere. Its concern is to explore distribution possibilities and to provide a critical discussion about the functions of an exhibition. Archive translates, organizes, and circulates critically invested materials. It was founded in 2009 by Chiara Figone.

== Archive Kabinett ==
Archive Kabinett is an exhibition space dedicated to the publishing field and it functions as headquarters for the publishing house Archive Books and magazine Archive Journal. Archive Kabinett works as exhibition space, library and venue for conferences and lectures. Its spaces are designed by nOffice, an architectural practice based in Berlin and London. nOffice explores the intersection of critical architecture, urban intervention and the art world.

Events organized at Archive Kabinett:

- The Exhibitionist launch, panel discussion: Jens Hoffmann, Chuz Martínez, Adriano Pedrosa and Tara McDowell, 11 February 2010
- The Loose Bookshop, exhibition and temporary bookshop, 10 December 2009
- Simon Fujiwara, lecture and book launch, 6 October 2009

== Archive Books ==
Archive Books explores and conveys art publications as a method to inspire art practices into the public discussion. Its program includes artists’ books, monographs and magazines.

In 2010 Archive Books launched The Exhibitionist: A Journal for Exhibition Making, a bi-annual magazine focused on curatorial practice and exhibition making. The founding editors are Jens Hoffmann and Chiara Figone.

Members of the editorial board are: Carolyn Christov-Bakargiev, Okwui Enwezor, Kate Fowle, Mary Jane Jacob, Constance Lewallen, Maria Lind, Chus Martínez, Jessica Morgan, Julian Myers, Hans Ulrich Obrist, Paul O’Neill, Adriano Pedrosa, Dieter Roelstraete, Dorothea von Hantelmann.

List of Archive Book's releases:

- Lara Favaretto, Momentary Monument I (The Swamp), June 2010, first artist’s book
- The Witness, May 2010, book accompanying the exhibition "All the Memory of the World" at GAM, Turin
- Reto Pulfer, Der Themenkatalog und andere Künstlerbücher, May 2010, first artist’s book
- The Exhibitionist 2, June 2010
- The Exhibitionist 1, January 2010
- Clemens von Wedemeyer, First Contact – film material nº4, information on "the fourth wall", January 2010, newspaper available during the exhibition "The Fourth Wall" at Koch Oberhuber Wolff, Berlin
- Ian Kiaer, What Where, November 2009, catalogue accompanying Ian Kiaer’s solo show at GAM, Turin
- Catherine Griffiths and Dan Rees, Home for Lost Ideas, June 2009
- Simon Fujiwara, The Incest Museum, A Guide by Simon Fujiwara, May 2009
- Archive Journal, issue 0, January 2009

== Archive Journal ==
Archive Journal is a cross-disciplinary magazine published twice a year. The journal features letters, essays, interviews and transcripts focused on contemporary art, architecture and politics. Archive’s Journal editors are Markus Miessen and Chiara Figone.

Issues:

- Archive Journal, Issue 0, the manifesto issue

== Bibliography ==
- From a Politics of Nostalgia to a Politics of Change by Markus Miessen in Cognitive Architecture. From Bio-Politics To Noo-Politics. Architecture & Mind in the Age of Communication & Information, editors: Deborah Hauptmann and Warren Neidich, 010 Publications, Rotterdam, 2010
- Alias, supplement of Il Manifesto, 5 December 2009
