= Implied license =

Unwritten license

An implied license is an unwritten license which permits a party (the licensee) to do something that would normally require the express permission of another party (the licensor). Implied licenses may arise by operation of law from actions by the licensor which lead the licensee to believe that it has the necessary permission.

Implied licenses often arise where the licensee has purchased a physical embodiment of some intellectual property belonging to the licensor, or has paid for its creation, but has not obtained permission to use the intellectual property.

== Examples ==
- A person who purchases a record album does not explicitly purchase a right to perform that album by playing it on a record player, but this right is implied.
- In patent law, if an employee invents something while on company time, the employer receives an implied license to use the invention, even if no contract exists to assign rights to the employer. This is sometimes referred to as shop right. In copyright law, the work for hire provision would grant the employer copyright to the work, provided the invention is within the employee's job description.
- In 2008, the Ninth US Circuit held that a non-exclusive license to use copyrighted material can be granted by implied license, but not an exclusive license. Further, if the creator has received consideration for the work, the non-exclusive grant is irrevocable.
- In Drabble (Harold) Ltd v. Hycolite Manufacturing Co. (44 TLR 264 (1928)), an advertising agency sued a customer and a newspaper for copyright infringement for printing an advertisement that the customer had paid the agency to prepare. The English Chancery Division held that the conduct of the parties implied a licence to use the copyrighted work.
- Where a copyrighted work has been commissioned, the law in the United Kingdom is that the creator retains rights in the commissioned work. Unauthorised use of the work would therefore infringe the creator's copyright. Nevertheless, the commissioner may have an implied license to use the commissioned work, although only for the particular purpose under which the commission was originally agreed.
- In its 2006 decision on Field v. Google, Inc. (CV-S-04-0413-RCJ-LRL), the US District Court for the District of Nevada ruled that web caching does not constitute a copyright violation, because of fair use and an implied license. In that context implied license refers to a de facto standard: if the copyright holder does not use any no-archive tags and robot exclusion standards to prevent caching.
- Holocaust victims who created and concealed materials documenting war atrocities gave implied consent for the distribution of such copyrighted material, which often amounts to fulfillment of their explicit wishes. In such cases following the letter of US copyright law, which protects unpublished anonymous works for 120 years since the year of their creation would go directly against their intentions.

== Types ==
In the United States, implied licenses are usually considered to be of two kinds: either they reflect the intention of the parties, which is inferred from a fact-specific inquiry into the surrounding circumstances, or else they are constructive agreements, in which case the intention of the parties is likely to be immaterial. In reality, there is a continuum between these kinds of implied license and it may be difficult to determine whether the license or contract in question is one which the law implies, irrespective of any protests by the unwilling licensor, or instead one inferred from the whole pattern of factual circumstances including the evidence of intent.

In England, there is more of a tendency to regard all implied licenses as matters of fact and intent, while what would be a license implied by law in the US is treated under some other branch of substantive law such as the doctrine of non-derogation from grants.

In both countries, the exhaustion doctrine has the effect of creating an implied license to use a product sold under the "authority" of the patentee. It is controversial whether and to what extent contractual expedients can successfully limit the scope of such implied licenses.

== Express license ==
The opposite of an implied license is an express license, which, for some forms of intellectual property, must be in writing. Oral exclusive licenses were permitted, however, under US copyright law before 1978. Oral nonexclusive copyright licenses remain valid under US law. Patent licenses may be oral. Licenses under the Semiconductor Chip Protection Act must be in writing.
