= EOT =

Eot or EOT may refer to:

== Science ==
- Equation of time
- Extraordinary optical transmission

== Technology ==
- Electric overhead traveling crane
- Embedded OpenType, a font file format
- End-of-tape, a marker indicating the end of a magnetic tape
- End of Term Web Archive, project to preserve U.S. federal government websites during administration change
- End-of-Transmission character, a transmission control character
- Equivalent oxide thickness, of a semiconductor
- Eyes of Things, a computer vision project

== Transport ==
- End-of-train device
- Engine order telegraph, a ship or submarine's speed control
- Massachusetts Executive Office of Transportation, a former government agency merged into the Massachusetts Department of Transportation

== Education ==
- End of Term exams

== Other uses ==
- Employee ownership trust
- Eot (island), in Micronesia
- Eotile language
- Greek National Tourism Organization (Greek: Εθνικός Οργανισμός Τουρισμού)
