= Linked by Air =

Linked by Air is a design and technology firm in Dumbo, Brooklyn founded in 2005 by Tamara Maletic and Dan Michaelson. The two had previously studied together in the Yale University School of Art graphic design program. The firm's approach to design emphasizes change, growth, and modularity.

Linked by Air is best known for designing and developing digital products such as websites, mobile apps, and physical-digital experiences. It also creates brand identities and wayfinding systems. The firm works with cultural and academic institutions, businesses, and non-profit organizations internationally, and is known for its impact on cultural organizations in New York City. Notable clients include the Brooklyn Public Library, Columbia GSAPP, The Shed, Whitney Museum of American Art, Het Nieuwe Instituut, Smithsonian Institution, Printed Matter and Yale University.

Members of the studio are also known for their teaching practices, including at Yale, Parsons School of Design, and Pratt Institute.

== Notable work and recognition ==
Among the studio's earliest works is the 2006 website for the Yale University School of Art, which allows all students, staff, and faculty to edit every page of the site without training, using a modular content management system. As of 2018, it had been modified by over 800 editors at the school. The website won an award in experience design in the AIGA 365 competition in 2007. Linked by Air won a second award in experience design that same year for the camera-based physical-digital experience, Prada Mirrors, commissioned by the design firm 2x4 for the Prada “epicenter” in Manhattan's Soho neighborhood.

Significant projects include the website of the Whitney Museum of American Art, designed in 2009 and revisited in 2013, in anticipation of the museum's move into its new building. That website features a “sunset” every night, experienced by all visitors to the website at the same time. New sunsets have been commissioned seasonally from artists including LaTurbo Avedon, Kristen Lucas, American Artist, Rafaël Rozendaal, and Jodi.

In 2012, the studio was awarded the Jury Prize of the Brno Graphic Design Biennial.

Working with the Hirshhorn Museum and Sculpture Garden, Linked by Air built Smithsonian Hi, a mobile web-based museum guide that uses real-time image recognition to let users learn more about objects on view. The platform was later also adopted by the National Museum of African Art and the National Museum of African American History and Culture.

In 2021, the firm developed signage and environmental graphics for the Brooklyn Public Library's new Adams Street branch in Dumbo, the first new public library built in Brooklyn since 1983. The exterior of the library is painted with the label “LIBRARY” in very large white letters, visible from across the East River.

In 2022, Linked by Air helped the Cooper Hewitt, Smithsonian Design Museum develop a non-linear digital platform for its exhibitions. The first use of the platform was the digital complement to the museum's physical exhibition about American fashion designer Willi Smith.
