= Engineered Lifting Systems & Equipment =

Engineered Lifting Systems & Equipment Inc.
- Company type: Private
- Industry: Manufacturing
- Founded: Waterloo, Ontario (1971)
- Founder: Jim Muir
- Headquarters: Elmira, Ontario
- Key people: Paul Whittaker - Owner, CEO
- Revenue: ▲ unknown CAD (2009)
- Net income: ▲ unknown CAD (2009)
- Total assets: unknown at this point CAD
- Number of employees: 35 (2010)
- Website: ELS

Engineered Lifting Systems & Equipment Inc (ELS) is a Canadian manufacturing company specializing in standard and custom overhead material lifting systems and equipment. ELS was founded in by Jim Muir in Waterloo, Ontario and its headquarters is currently located in Elmira, Ontario.

== History ==
ELS was founded under the name Mentor Dynamics in 1971 by Jim Muir. The primary focus of the business was related to structural steel fabrications. A significant customer at the time was Kraus Carpets as Mentor Dynamics helped construct the building, storage hoppers and an extensive carpet handling system that is still in use today.

In the mid 1970s Jim Muir started working with the ship building industry to develop a low friction lining system to facilitate the movement of bulk materials in the holds of self-unloading ships. After the fastening process was patented, Mentor Dynamics eventually lined dozens of ships. Most of the original liners are still in place.

In the early 1980s Mentor Dynamics was presented with a few additional business opportunities. One came in the form of an overhead conveyor system, which still provides a steady stream of business. The other opportunity was the manufacturing of overhead cranes as another manufacturer moved out of Ontario leaving Mentor to serve their established customer base.

The crane business grew steadily through the 80's; eventually developing into jib cranes, monorails and wide spans double girder cranes. Carl Young purchased the company in April 1989. He incorporated it as Mentor Dynequip Inc. but kept Mentor Dynamics as the operating name. The focus was on designing and making small to mid-sized overhead cranes and gantry cranes. Mentor was also a distributor for hoist and specialty crane manufactures. In early 1992 the business was restructured, this time without the ship liner business or the 36,000-square-foot (3,300 m^{2}) company owned factory.

The company was sold again in August 1998, this time to Paul Whittaker, P.Eng. It was operated as Mentor Dynamics, with the corporate name registered as Engineered Lifting Systems & Equipment Inc. As of January 1, 2008 Mentor Dynamics moved to its own property and building in Elmira, Ontario. Coinciding with the move, the company also changed its name from Mentor Dynamics to Engineered Lifting Systems & Equipment Inc. (ELS) to better communicate the essence of its business endeavors.

In 2015 ELS opened a second manufacturing plant dedicated to the production of the Destuff-IT product line. This 9,300 square foot facility is located near the main plant in Elmira, ON Canada.

== Products ==
A Lifting Device From ELS

Engineered Lifting Systems & Equipment Inc still manufactures its products under the brand name Mentor Dynamics as well as acting as a distributor for such companies Gorbel, Anver, Schlumpf, Columbus McKinnon Industrial Products, Stahl Crane Systems, Kito Hoists, Lift-Tech, Budgit, and Shaw-Box hoists. Some of the products that ELS manufactures include: overhead cranes, below the crane hooks, intelligent devices, hoists, trolleys, balancers, Destuff-IT unloaders and Restuff-IT Bi-Directionals, and transfer carts.

== See also ==
- Professional Engineers of Ontario
- American Society of Mechanical Engineers
- Crane Manufacturers Association of America
