= KFN =

KFN or kfn could refer to:

- .kfn, a file extension
- Kennisbank Filosofie Nederland, precursor to the Dutch philosophy database Repertorium der Nederlandse Wijsbegeerte
- Kemi Filani News, Nigerian online news publication
- Kluane First Nation, a First Nations band in Yukon, Canada
- Kolfanite, a mineral; see List of mineral symbols
- Kʼómoks First Nation, a First Nations band in British Columbia, Canada
- Korfball Federation of Nepal; see List of national korfball associations
- Kuk language, Grassfields Bantu language of Cameroon
