= Rhizome (organization) =

Nonprofit organization supporting digital art and culture

Rhizome at the New Museum
- Formation: 1997
- Founder: Mark Tribe
- Type: Art nonprofit
- Headquarters: 235 Bowery, New York, NY 10002
- Location: New York
- Executive Director: Zachary Kaplan
- Key people: Michael Connor, Makayla Bailey, Dragan Espenschied
- Website: https://rhizome.org/

Rhizome is an American not-for-profit arts organization that supports and provides a platform for new media art.

== History ==
Artist and curator Mark Tribe founded Rhizome as an email list in 1996 while living in Berlin. The list included a number of people Tribe had met at Ars Electronica. By August, Rhizome had launched its website, which by 1998 had developed a significant readership within the Internet art community. Originally designated a business, Rhizome became a nonprofit organization in 1998, switching to the domain-name suffix ".org". In an interview with Laurel Ptak for the Bard Center for Curatorial Studies and Art in Contemporary Culture Archive, Tribe explains "I thought of it as Artforum meets AltaVista (AltaVista was one of the first web search engines), as a kind of bottom-up alternative to the top-down hierarchies of the art world."

Rhizome established an online archive called the ArtBase in 1999. The ArtBase was initially conceived exclusively as a database of net art works. Today, the scope of the ArtBase has expanded to include other forms of art engaged with technology, including games, software, and interdisciplinary projects with online elements. The works are submitted by the artists themselves. In addition to hosting archived work, Rhizome's digital preservation work includes conservation of digital art and updating obsolete code.

In 2003, Rhizome became affiliated with the New Museum of Contemporary Art in New York City. Today, Rhizome's programs include events, exhibitions at the New Museum and elsewhere, an active website, and an archive of more than 2,000 new media artworks. This relationship has been contentious at times, with Rhizome members citing the museum's toxic working environment practices including verbal harassment and abuse.

The organization has published books. One book was "The Best of Rhizome 2012" edited by former editor Joanne McNeil. In 2015, the organization relaunched rhizome.org with a new design created by Wieden+Kennedy.

== Digital preservation program ==
Rhizome operates a digital preservation program, led by Dragan Espenschied, which is focused on the creation of free, open source software tools to decentralize web archiving and software preservation practices and ensure continuous access to its collections of born-digital art.

=== ArtBase ===
Founded in 1999, the Rhizome ArtBase is an online archive of new media art containing some 2,110 art works. The ArtBase encompasses a vast range of projects by artists all over the world that employ materials including software, code, websites, moving image, games and browsers to aesthetic and critical ends.

=== Web archiving ===
In response to the needs of the ArtBase—as well as to the increasing number of artists creating works on social media platforms and as interactive websites—in 2014 Rhizome began a program to develop open source web archiving tools that could both serve its mission and a broader community of users. Rhizome launched the social media archiving tool Colloq in 2014, which works by replicating the interface of social media platforms. Amalia Ulman's instagram project "Excellences and Perfections" (2014) was the first social media artwork archived with Colloq. Colloq pays special attention to the way a user interacts with the social media interface at the time of creation, using a technique called "web capturing" to store website behaviors. The tool was developed by Ilya Kreymer and Rhizome's Digital Conservator Dragan Espenscheid. In 2015, Rhizome unveiled its archive of the influential art blog VVORK, marking the first time Colloq was used to archive an entire website. Archiving VVORK allowed Rhizome to tackle the challenge of archiving embedded video content, which is often hosted on a third-party site. The website had been previously archived by Internet Archive, but this recording did not include embedded media like videos that Colloq was built to capture. Of the tool, Jon Ippolito, professor of new media at the University of Maine, said: it makes archives "as close as possible, you're going to get the experience of interacting with the actual site."

==== Webrecorder ====
In 2015, Rhizome folded the Colloq project into a more expansive "Webrecorder" initiative. In August 2016, the organization launched the public release of a more fully realized Webrecorder.io tool, which was a free web archiving tool that allowed users to create their own archives of the dynamic web. Funded by the Andrew W. Mellon Foundation, Webrecorder.io was targeted towards archiving social media, video content, and other dynamic content, rather than static webpages. Webrecorder.io was an attempt to place web archiving tools in the hands of individual users and communities. It used a "symmetrical web archiving" (browser-based) approach, meaning the same software is used to both record and play back the website. While other web archiving tools run a web crawler to capture sites, Webrecorder.io took a different method, recording network traffic while a user browsed the site to capture its interactive features.

==== OldWeb.Today ====
In December 2015, Rhizome launched OldWeb.Today, a project that allows users to view archived webpages within emulated versions of legacy web browsers. Users are given the option of browsing the site of their choice within versions of Mosaic, Netscape Navigator, Internet Explorer, Mozilla Firefox, Google Chrome, and Ruffle. The project gives users a deeper understanding of web history and the way browsing environments alter one's experience of the internet. It is an example of "Emulation as a Service" technology, imitating old software programs so that they can run on new computers.

OldWeb.Today continues to be maintained by Webrecorder.

==== Conifer ====
In June 2020, Rhizome renamed their Webrecorder.io project to Conifer while Ilya Kreymer split Webrecorder off to become a separate entity. Conifer continues to let its users "create high-fidelity, interactive captures of any web site you browse and a platform to make those captured websites accessible." Conifer is powered by its users and gives the power to "create, curate, and share their own collections of web materials. This can even include items that would be only revealed after logging in or performing complicated actions on a web site." This tool also lets users save items with "complex scripting, such as embedded videos, fancy navigation, or 3D graphics," which "have a much higher success rate for capture with Conifer than with traditional web archives."

According to their user guide, Conifer works by putting web pages into "sessions." These "sessions" work by "requests sent by the browser and responses from the web are captured while you are interacting with sites." Conifer defines a collection as a series of these sessions. When someone wants to view the sessions, Conifer "makes the browser request resources from the collection instead of the live web. Viewers of a collection should be able to repeat any action during access that were performed during capture."

Conifer allows users to upload data in multiple formats, including:

- WARC files created with any web archiving tool (an ISO standard for web archiving)
- ARC files (the predecessor of WARC)
- HAR files (a deprecated browser and web site debugging protocol format)

Conifer allows content to be captured via the local browser, or through a remote browser hosted on their servers accessed through a screen share.

The choice of browser effects how the data will be captured. Conifer states that "There are four factors in a capture session: the browser that is operated by the user, its connection to the web archiving backend that writes the data, network location, and user identity." The browser performs the network requests, and anything that is not requested cannot be captured. Ad blocker and privacy features can affect these requests. Also, webpages could appear differently due to the capabilities of each different browser. Conifer also gives the option for users to use their remote browser, which lets users "use the exact same browser for both capture and access." These browsers run in the cloud and are pre-configured by Conifer for use in capturing websites.

There are also different ways that the browser can connect to Conifer: through "rewriting mode" or "proxy mode." In the Rewriting mode, "all resources the browser requests are changed on the fly so that instead of reaching out to the original URL on the live web, everything goes through the conifer.rhizome.org web archiving server." Proxy mode "has the web archiving backend connected to the browser via a web proxy…The browser can make requests as usual and the web archiving backend will have access to all of them, with almost no rewriting required. This makes proxy mode generally a more stable and reliable capture method that doesn't require constant updating."

Conifer can also capture content when a user is logged into a website but say that a website may look different depending on if the user is logged in or not. However, Conifer warns that "You may log in to websites during a session, however, do note that your credentials may be captured as data within your collection…If you need to capture a site that requires login, consider creating a throwaway account just for the purpose of capturing."

Despite that Adobe Flash Player went offline at the end of 2020, Conifer can still capture sites that used Flash, saying "As long as a Flash site remains online it will still be accessible and able to be archived … even after the deadline."

Nicola Jayne Bingham and Helena Byrne have stated that programs such as Conifer offer "potential for collecting and creating much more heritage; in practice however, 'recording' websites is a manual, extremely time-consuming process and can only be used very selectively due to resource constraints." However, Byrne and Bingham also state that "Conifer has great potential to democratise the web archiving process as websites archived by individuals external to the LDLs can be added to UKWA, creating possibilities for more diversity within the archive."

The Conifer tool also has been suggested for use in Special Interest Archival groups, such as the group for art. According to Sumitra Duncan, founder of the Web Archiving Special Interest Group, "For the last few years we have been toying with the idea of using … Conifer service … to create a SIG web archive collection that we can use as a teaching tool for members who are new to web archiving. Unfortunately, a lack of 'staff' time and funds for long-term data storage has prevented us from enacting this idea in the past and still applies."

On 15 December 2025, Rhizome announced it would be discontinuing its Conifer web archiving service in June 2026. Effective immediately, the creation of new accounts or the purchase of subscriptions was no longer supported.

== Rhizome Commissions Program ==
Founded in 2001 to support artists working with technology, the Rhizome Commissions Program has awarded more than 100 commissions as of 2016. In 2008, Rhizome expanded the scope of the commissions from strictly Internet-based art to the broad range of forms and practices that fall under the category of new media art. This includes projects that creatively engage new and networked technologies or reflect on the impact of these tools and media. With this expanded format, commissioned works can take the final form of online works, performance, video, installation or sound art. Projects can be made for the context of the gallery, the public, the web or networked devices.

Among the artists awarded a Rhizome commission: Heba Amin, Aleksandra Domanović, Aram Bartholl, Knifeandfork (Brian House and Sue Huang), Mendi & Keith Obadike, Trevor Paglen, Jon Rafman, Tao Lin, Tristan Perich, Angelo Plessas. Brody Condon, Jona Bechtolt, Kristin Lucas, Evan Roth, Rafaël Rozendaal, eteam, Steve Lambert, Zach Lieberman, Ryota Matsumoto, Porpentine.

=== Microgrants ===
Since 2014, Rhizome has also regularly supported internet art through their Microgrants program. Microgrants are small grants ($500-$1500) for the creation of new artworks, online exhibitions, and other web-based projects to support creative projects. Awardees are considered for further programming with Rhizome and inclusion in ArtBase.

Among the artists awarded a Rhizome Microgrant: Angela Washko, Ben Grosser, Rafia Santana, Amira Hanafi, Sam Lavigne, Tega Brain, Manuel Arturo Abreu, Caroline Sinders, Cassie McQuater, Dina Kelberman, Chia Amisola, Daniela Medina Poch, Tanvi Mishra, Dominique Petit-Frere, Helen Shewolfe Tseng, Nitcha Tothong, Yaa Addae, Shakti Mb, Lalla Cavalheira, Mo Wisdom, Spencer Chang, and Sanjna Selva.

=== NEW INC ===
NEW INC is the New Museum's cultural incubator. Since the start of the program in 2014, Rhizome has been a partner organization supporting the Art & Code track, which supports creative and artistic uses of computation.

Among the artists who have participated in NEW INC's Art & Code Track: Ricardo Miranda Zúñiga, Bhavik Singh, Roopa Vasudevan, Mindy Seu, Carrie Sijia Wang, Yehwan Song, Chelsea Thompto, Maya Man, SFPC, Babette Thomas, Banyi Huang, Camila Galaz, Spencer Chang, Nitcha Tothong, Kengchakaj Kengkarnka, Dan Gorelick, Shayn D Jackson, Munus Shih, Avneesh Sarwate, Sumanth Srinivasan, Aurora Mititelu, and ¡wénrán zhào!

== Exhibition program ==
In its two decades of activity, Rhizome has presented exhibitions online and in gallery spaces.

=== ArtBase 101 ===
In 2005 at the New Museum, Rhizome presented this exhibition of 40 selections from its online archive of new media art, the ArtBase. Cocurated by then-director Lauren Cornell and former director Rachel Greene, the exhibition addressed dirt style, net cinema, games, e-commerce, data visualization and databases, online celebrity, public space, software, cyberfeminism, and early net.art. Selected artists included John F. Simon Jr., M. River and T. Whid Art Associates, 0100101110101101.org, Young-Hae Chang Heavy Industries, and Cory Arcangel. Sarah Boxer, reviewing the exhibition for the New York Times called Artbase 101 "an ambitious and risky thing to do."

=== New York New York Happy Happy (NY NY HP HP) ===
In 2013, the organization presented an experiential artwork by artist Ed Fornieles, which sent up art world and high society debauchery with "forced undressing", eating salami slices from nude bodies, the exploitation of unpaid performance artists, and male strippers. Writing for Noisy, Zach Sokol said of the event: "Fornieles may be tinkering with the idea that we force imagined social archetypes and social spaces into existence... We all become sociopaths when there are beautiful people, fancy spaces, exclusivity, and of course documentation with iPhones, cameras, and video cameras."

=== Net Art Anthology ===
In October 2016, Rhizome launched Net Art Anthology, a two-year online exhibition devoted to restaging 100 key artworks from the history of net art. One project per week will be restaged and conceptualized through an online exhibition page. Devised in tandem with Rhizome's digital conservation department, Net Art Anthology makes use of the tools Rhizome has developed for preserving dynamic web-based artworks. The project was launched with an artists' panel at the New Museum on October 27, 2016, featuring Olia Lialina, Martha Wilson, Mark Tribe, and Ricardo Dominguez.

== Seven on Seven ==
Since 2010, Rhizome has held an annual conference at the New Museum pairing leading technologists and contemporary artists to create something new—art, apps, often arguments about digital culture. The program has led to many influential projects such as a start-up called Monegraph; a short documentary film for The New York Times by Laura Poitras; and artworks later shown at major art institutions, like Image Atlas by Taryn Simon and Aaron Swartz.

Artists that have participated in Seven on Seven: Evan Roth, Aaron Koblin, Monica Narula, Ryan Trecartin, Tauba Auerbach, Marc Andre Robinson, Kristin Lucas, Michael Bell-Smith, Ricardo Cabello (mr.doob), Liz Magic Laser, Zach Lieberman, Rashaad Newsome, Ryder Ripps, Camille Utterback, Emily Royston, Aram Bartholl, Xavier Cha, LaToya Ruby Frazier, Naeem Mohaiemen, Jon Rafman, Taryn Simon and Stephanie Syjuco.

Technologists who have participated in Seven on Seven: Jeff Hammerbacher, Joshua Schachter, Matt Mullenweg, Andrew Kortina, Hilary Mason, Ayah Bdeir, David Karp, Andy Baio, Ben Cerveny, Jeri Ellsworth, Kellan Elliott-McCrea, Bre Pettis, Chris Poole (moot), Erica Sadun, Jeremy Ashkenas, Blaine Cook, Michael Herf, Charles Forman, Aaron Swartz, Grant Olney Passmore, Khoi Vinh and Anthony Volodkin.

Previous Seven on Sevens have been supported by Ace Hotel and HTC.

== See also ==
- Digital art
- Digital curation
- Internet art
- Net.art
- Surfing club
- List of digital preservation initiatives
