= Webrecorder =

American technology company

Webrecorder Software LLC
- Type: Private
- Founded: 5 February 2020
- Founder: Ilya Kreymer
- Products: ReplayWeb.page, Browsertrix, OldWeb.Today, ArchiveWeb.page
- Website: https://webrecorder.net

Webrecorder is an American technology company founded by Ilya Kreymer that builds open source web archiving tools and maintains the WACZ file format, a zipped collection of raw WARC files.

== History ==
In 2016 Rhizome was awarded a $600,000 USD multi-year grant from the Andrew W. Mellon Foundation to fund and continue to operate Webrecorder.io, an open source website that allowed users to archive and replay archived webpages. Led by Ilya Kreymer and Dragan Espenschied, the project would build atop Kreymer's previous work as a consultant for Rhizome and continue to use pywb for capture and playback of WARC files.

In 2020 after four years of development, Rhizome and Kreymer announced that Webrecorder would split into its own commercial entity, with the archiving service being renamed to "Conifer". Following the split, Kreymer would go on to release ArchiveWeb.page and ReplayWeb.page — applications that allow users to archive and replay archived webpages respectively, without the use of a central server to facilitate the capture or playback of archived material.

In 2021, Webrecorder was awarded multiple grants from the Filecoin Foundation to work on design and standardization of browser-based web archive file formats and further development of Browsertrix, Webrecorder's cloud-based SaaS archiving platform.

In 2024, Webrecorder enabled open signups for Browsertrix allowing anyone to create their own account and start archiving websites. The company also joined the End of Term Web Archive effort, focusing on the capture and replay of complex interactive websites.

== Products ==
=== ArchiveWeb.page ===
ArchiveWeb.page is a browser extension and standalone desktop application that allows users to interactively create high-fidelity web archives as they browse the web similar to Rhizome's Conifer. Because ArchiveWeb.page uses a full browser for archiving, it has been noted as being "more successful" than other non-browser-based archiving tools such as Heritrix at the cost of requiring manual operation during the capture process.

ArchiveWeb.page supports exporting both WARC and WACZ files.

=== Browsertrix ===
Browsertrix is Webrecorder's SaaS web archiving suite that allows users to crawl websites using a browser-based crawler and share links to web archives.

Browsertrix supports importing and exporting WACZ files.

=== ReplayWeb.page ===
ReplayWeb.page is Webrecorder's browser-based web archive viewer available as both a web application and standalone desktop application.

ReplayWeb.page can view archived content within WARC, WACZ, and HAR files

== See also ==
- List of Web archiving initiatives
- Internet Archive
