= Gmod =

Gmod or GMOD may refer to:

- Generic Model Organism Database (GMOD), a software project for model organism databases
- .GMOD, file extension for Golgotha 3D models; See List of filename extensions (F–L)
- Gamma-ray MODule (GMOD), an instrument on the satellite EIRSAT-1
- G-module (G-Mod), in mathematics
- Garry's Mod (GMod), a sandbox game based on a modification of the first-person shooter video game Half-Life 2
