= ZZ Canis Minoris =

Symbiotic binary

Observation data Epoch J2000 Equinox ICRS
- Constellation: Canis Minor
- Right ascension: 07^{h} 24^{m} 13.9974^{s}
- Declination: +08° 53′ 51.787″
- Apparent magnitude (V): 9.7 - 10.6

Characteristics

Red giant
- Evolutionary stage: AGB
- Spectral type: M4-M6 III
- Variable type: SRc

Astrometry
| Radial velocity (R_{v}) | −4.89±0.55 km/s |
| Proper motion (μ) | RA: −0.202 mas/yr Dec.: −4.224 mas/yr |
| Parallax (π) | 0.7644±0.0516 mas |
| Distance | 4,050+310 −260 ly (1,241+94 −80 pc) |

Details

Red giant
| Mass | 1.8–2.4±0.4 M_{☉} |
| Radius | 231±16 R_{☉} |
| Luminosity | 5,350±750 L_{☉} |
| Temperature | 3,131±69 K |

White dwarf
| Mass | 1? M_{☉} |

Other designations
- ZZ CMi, BD+09°1633, HIP 35915, TIC 453173127, IRAS 07214+0859

Database references
| SIMBAD | data |

ZZ Canis Minoris is a symbiotic binary in the constellation Canis Minor. It is 4,000 light-years distant and is not visible to the naked eye with a maximum apparent magnitude of +9.7.

This binary system is made up of a red giant primary and a white dwarf secondary that is accreting material from the red giant. The accretion disk around the white dwarf and the collision of both components' stellar winds create X-ray emission. It does not show any silicon oxide (SiO) masers, nor an infrared excess that would identify it as a dusty symbiotic binary. The orbital period of the system is tentatively inferred to be 983 days.

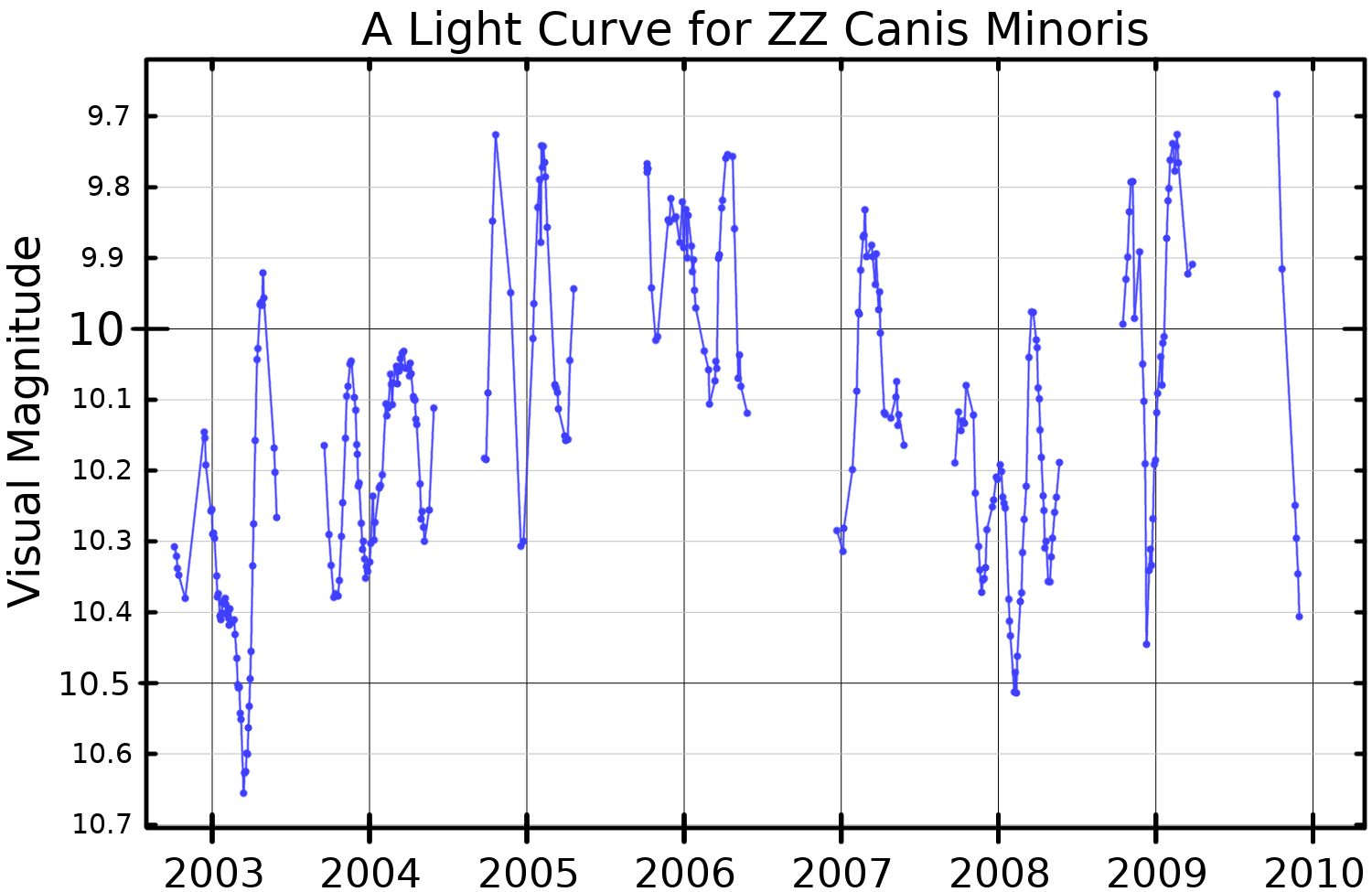
A light curve for ZZ Canis Minoris, plotted from ASAS data

The red giant primary is a semiregular variable, with an apparent magnitude that varies from 9.7 to 10.6 over an uncertain period, values of 106 and 437 days have been published. It has over 230 times the Sun's radius and is 5,350 times as luminous, radiating this energy from a cool, 3,200 K photosphere. It is on the asymptotic giant branch stage of its evolution, and is likely filling its roche lobe.
