= Port Huron Project =

Historical reenactment events

The Port Huron Project is a series of six reenactments of protest speeches from the New Left movements of the 1960s and '70s. Between September 2006 and September 2008, each event took place at the site of the original speech, and was delivered by a performer to an audience of passers-by and invited guests. Videos, audio recordings, and photographs of these performances are presented in various venues and distributed online and on DVD as open-source media.

== Reenactments ==
Port Huron Project 1
Until the Last Gun Is Silent

The first reenactment took place on September 16, 2006, and was based on a speech given by Coretta Scott King at a peace march in Central Park on April 27, 1968, approximately three weeks after the assassination of Martin Luther King Jr. The speech, which she based on notes found in her husband's pockets when he died, addresses the war in Vietnam, domestic poverty, and the power of women to effect social change. Gina Brown, a New York-based actor and former welfare mother, delivered the speech.

Port Huron Project 2
The Problem Is Civil Obedience

Matthew Floyd Miller on the Boston Common in July, 2007 reenacting a speech by Howard Zinn.

The second event in the series took place on July 14, 2007. It was based on a speech originally delivered by author and activist Howard Zinn at a peace march on Boston Common on May 5, 1971. In this speech, Zinn defended the use of civil disobedience to protest the war in Vietnam and called on Congress to impeach the president and vice president of the United States for the "high crime" of "making war on the peasants of Southeast Asia."

Port Huron Project 3
We Must Name the System

Max Bunzel delivering an antiwar speech by Paul Potter.

The third reenactment was staged near the Washington Monument on the National Mall in Washington, D.C., on July 26, 2007. The original speech was given at the April 17, 1965 March on Washington To End the War in Vietnam by Students for a Democratic Society (SDS) President Paul Potter. Potter offered an insightful critique of our government's use of the rhetoric of freedom to justify war, and calls for citizens of the United States to create a massive social movement to build a "democratic and humane society in which Vietnams are unthinkable."

Selection criteria for the Port Huron Project included identifying New Left protest speeches, finding transcripts and/or recordings, and determining the locations in which specific speeches were given. Attention is given to speeches that were delivered at protests or demonstrations in public spaces and address issues of peace and social justice.

Port Huron Project 4
We Are Also Responsible

Based on a 1971 speech by César Chávez at 6:00 PM, Saturday, July 19, 2008, at South Lawn, Exposition Park, Los Angeles Presented by Creative Time with Los Angeles Contemporary Exhibitions (LACE)

Port Huron Project 5
The Liberation of Our People

Based on a 1969 speech by Angela Davis at 6:00 PM, Saturday, August 2, 2008, at DeFremery Park, Oakland Presented by Creative Time with the Oakland Museum of California

Port Huron Project 6
Let Another World Be Born

Based on a 1967 speech by Stokely Carmichael at 6:00 PM, Sunday, September 7, 2008, Adjacent to the United Nations, NYC Presented by Creative Time

== Artist ==
The Port Huron Project was organized by Mark Tribe, then an assistant professor in the Department of Modern Culture and Media at Brown University, who is also an artist and curator whose interests include art, technology, and politics. Tribe is the co-author, with Reena Jana, of New Media Art (Taschen, 2006). His art work has been exhibited at the ZKM Center for Art and Media Karlsruhe, the Ars Electronica Festival in Linz, and Gigantic Art Space in New York City. He has organized curatorial projects for the New Museum of Contemporary Art, MASS MoCA, and inSite_05. In 1996, Mark founded Rhizome, an online resource for new media artists, and he later chaired Rhizome's board of directors. He received an MFA in Visual Art from the University of California, San Diego in 1994 and a BA in Visual Art from Brown University in 1990.

A team of five Brown University students assisted Tribe in the summer of 2007. These students received funding from the Karen T. Romer Undergraduate Teaching and Research Awards, Brown University. General funding for the project was provided by office of the vice president for research, Brown University and the Department of Modern Culture and Media, Brown University.
