= Equivalent oxide thickness =

An equivalent oxide thickness usually given in nanometers (nm) is the thickness of silicon oxide film that provides the same electrical performance as that of a high-κ material being used.

The term is often used when describing field effect transistors, which rely on an electrically insulating pad of material between a gate and a doped semiconducting region. Device performance has typically been improved by reducing the thickness of a silicon oxide insulating pad. As the thickness of the insulating pad approached 5–10 nm, leakage current became a problem and alternate materials were necessary. These new materials had a lower equivalent oxide thickness so they could retain an appropriate gate oxide thickness to prevent leakage current while also increasing the switching speed.

For example, a high-κ material with dielectric constant of 39 (compared to 3.9 for silicon oxide) would be ten times thicker than that of silicon oxide, helping to reduce the leakage of electrons across the dielectric pad, while achieving the same capacitance and high performance. In other words silicon oxide film of one-tenth the thickness of the high-κ film would be required to achieve similar performance while ignoring leakage current.

Commonly used high-κ gate dielectrics include hafnium oxide and more recently aluminum oxide for gate-all-around devices.

$$\mathrm{EOT} = t_\text{high-κ} \left( \frac{k_{\text{SiO}_2}}{k_\text{high-κ}}\right)$$

The EOT definition is useful to quickly compare different dielectric materials to the industry standard silicon oxide dielectric, as:

$$\epsilon_0\, \epsilon_{\text{SiO}_2} \frac{A}{\mathrm{EOT}} = \epsilon_0 \, \epsilon_\text{high-κ} \, \frac{A}{t_\text{high-κ}} = C$$
