= Overhead crane =

Type of crane found in industrial environments

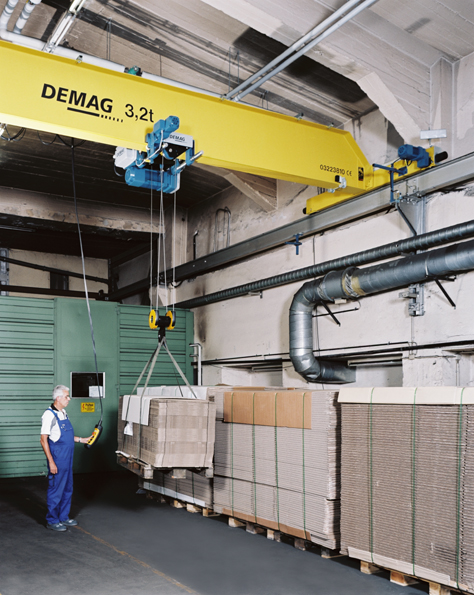
An overhead crane, featuring runways, bridge, and hoist in a traditional industrial environment.

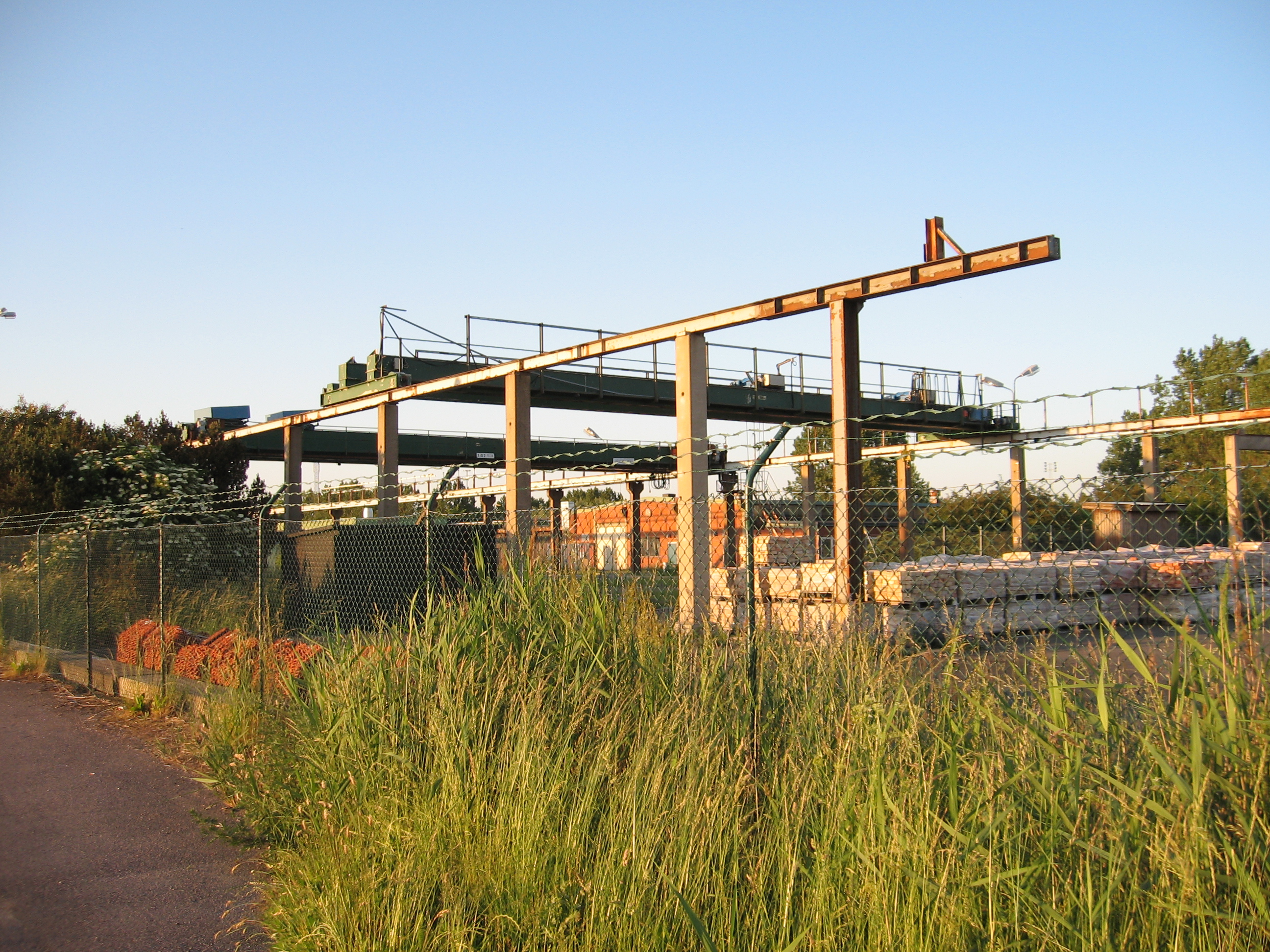
Overhead crane at the Skanska precast concrete factory in Hjärup, Sweden.

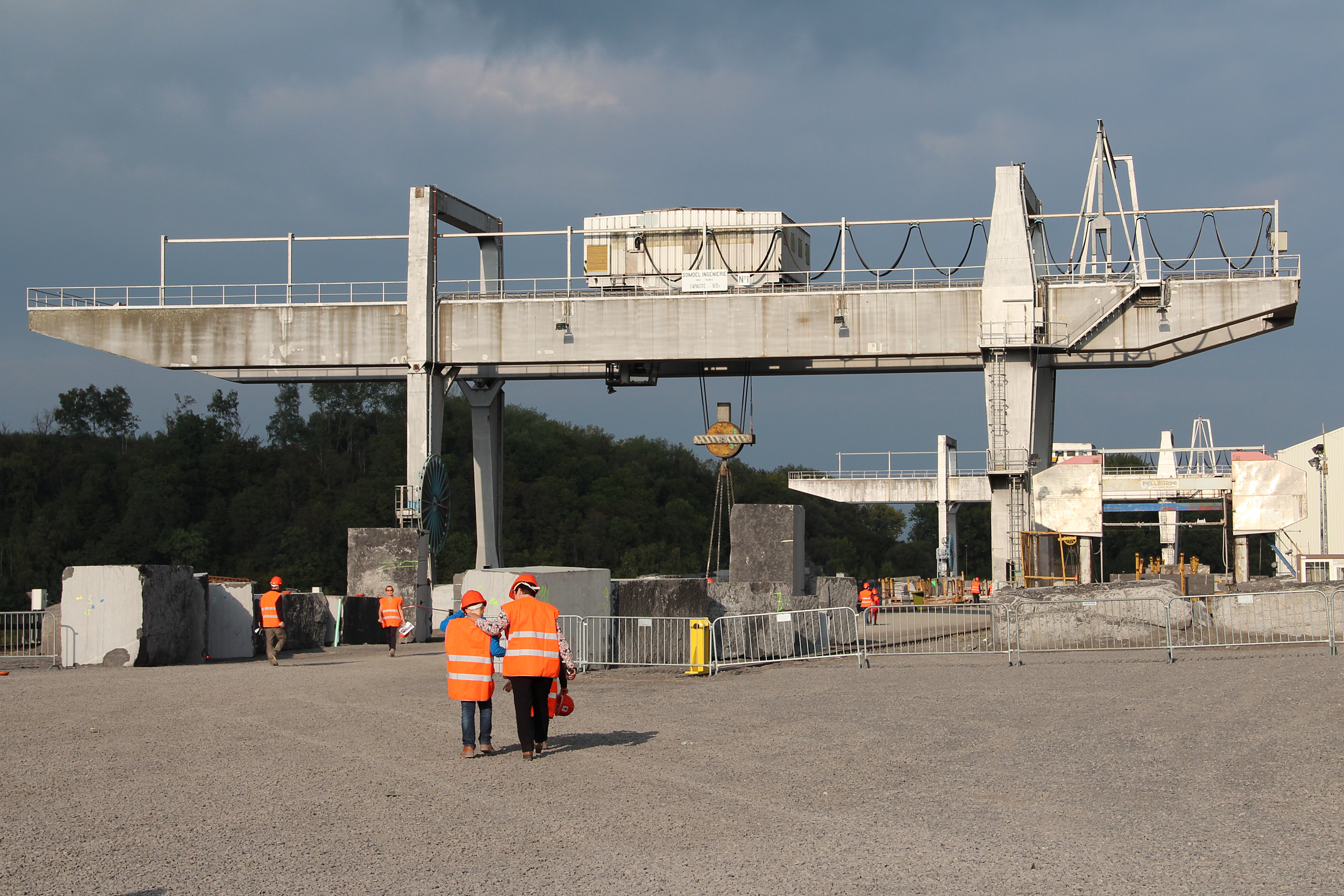
Gantry-style overhead cranes of the Hainaut quarry in Soignies, Belgium.

An overhead crane, commonly called a bridge crane, is a type of crane found in industrial environments. An overhead crane consists of two parallel rails seated on longitudinal I-beams attached to opposite steel columns by means of brackets. The traveling bridge spans the gap. A hoist, the lifting component of a crane, travels along the bridge. If the bridge is rigidly supported on two or more legs running on two fixed rails at ground level, the crane is called a gantry crane (USA, ASME B30 series) or a goliath crane (UK, BS 466). Another variant is the semi-goliath crane, where one fixed rail is at ground level, and the other fixed rail is overhead, commonly used along the exterior of an existing building.

Unlike mobile or construction cranes, overhead cranes are typically used for either manufacturing or maintenance applications, where efficiency or downtime are critical factors.

== Varieties ==
Single Girder Overhead Crane

Also known as Top Running Single Girder (TRSG). This is the most widely used configuration. The bridge consists of a single beam, making it well suited to lighter duty applications, typically up to about 15 tonnes.

Double Girder Overhead Crane

Also known as Top Running Double Girder (TRDG). Built with two bridge beams, this configuration handles much heavier loads, up to roughly 400 tonnes, and accommodates spans exceeding 100 feet. It also offers greater available lifting height, since the hoist travels on top of the beams with the hook positioned between them rather than below.

Suspended Overhead Crane

Also known as Under Running Single Girder (URSG). The runway rails are fixed directly to the building's roof structure rather than to floor mounted columns. Removing the dedicated support columns frees up floor space, though it reduces the maximum lifting capacity. A double girder version can be engineered for specific requirements.

Wall Mounted Overhead Crane

Mounted to the building's wall or columns rather than spanning the full width of the bay. It serves a defined work zone and can operate independently beneath an existing overhead crane, which allows two lifting operations to run in the same bay at the same time.

== History ==
In 1876 Sampson Moore in England designed and supplied the first ever electric overhead crane, which was used to hoist guns at the Royal Arsenal in Woolwich, London. Since that time Alliance Machine, now defunct, holds an AISE citation for one of the earliest cranes in the USA market. This crane was in service until approximately 1980, and is now in a museum in Birmingham, Alabama. Over the years important innovations, such as the Weston load brake (which is now rare) and the wire rope hoist (which is still popular), have come and gone. The original hoist contained components mated together in what is now called the built-up style hoist. These built up hoists are used for heavy-duty applications such as steel coil handling and for users desiring long life and better durability. They also provide for easier maintenance. Now many hoists are package hoists, built as one unit in a single housing, generally designed for ten-year life, but the life calculation is based on an industry standard when calculating actual life. See the Hoists Manufacturers Institute site for true life calculation, which is based on load and hours used. In today's modern world for the North American market, there are a few governing bodies for the industry. The Overhead Alliance is a group that represents Crane Manufacturers Association of America, Hoist Manufacturers Institute, and Monorail Manufacturers Association. These product counsels of the Material Handling Industry of America have joined forces to create promotional materials to raise the awareness of the benefits of overhead lifting. The members of this group are marketing representatives of the member companies.

=== Early manufacture ===
- 1830: First Crane company in Germany, Ludwig Stuckenholz company.
- 1840: Mass production of overhead cranes starts in Germany.
- 1854: Sampson Moore & Co in Liverpool, England patents a new winch mechanism that allowed the lifting of heavier weights (such as naval guns) by an electric motor.
- 1861: The first steam powered overhead crane is installed by John Ramsbottom at the Crewe Railway workshops. Power was transmitted to the crane from a pulley driven by a stationary engine through an endless cotton rope.
- 1887: The Ludwig Stuckenholz company introduces electrical components to overhead cranes, determining industry design.
- 1910: The first mass-produced electric motor hoist starts in Germany.

=== Electric Overhead Traveling Crane ===
Electric Overhead Traveling (EOT) cranes are a common type of overhead crane, found in many factories and warehouses. These cranes are electrically operated by a control pendant, radio/IR remote pendant, or from an operator cabin attached to the crane.

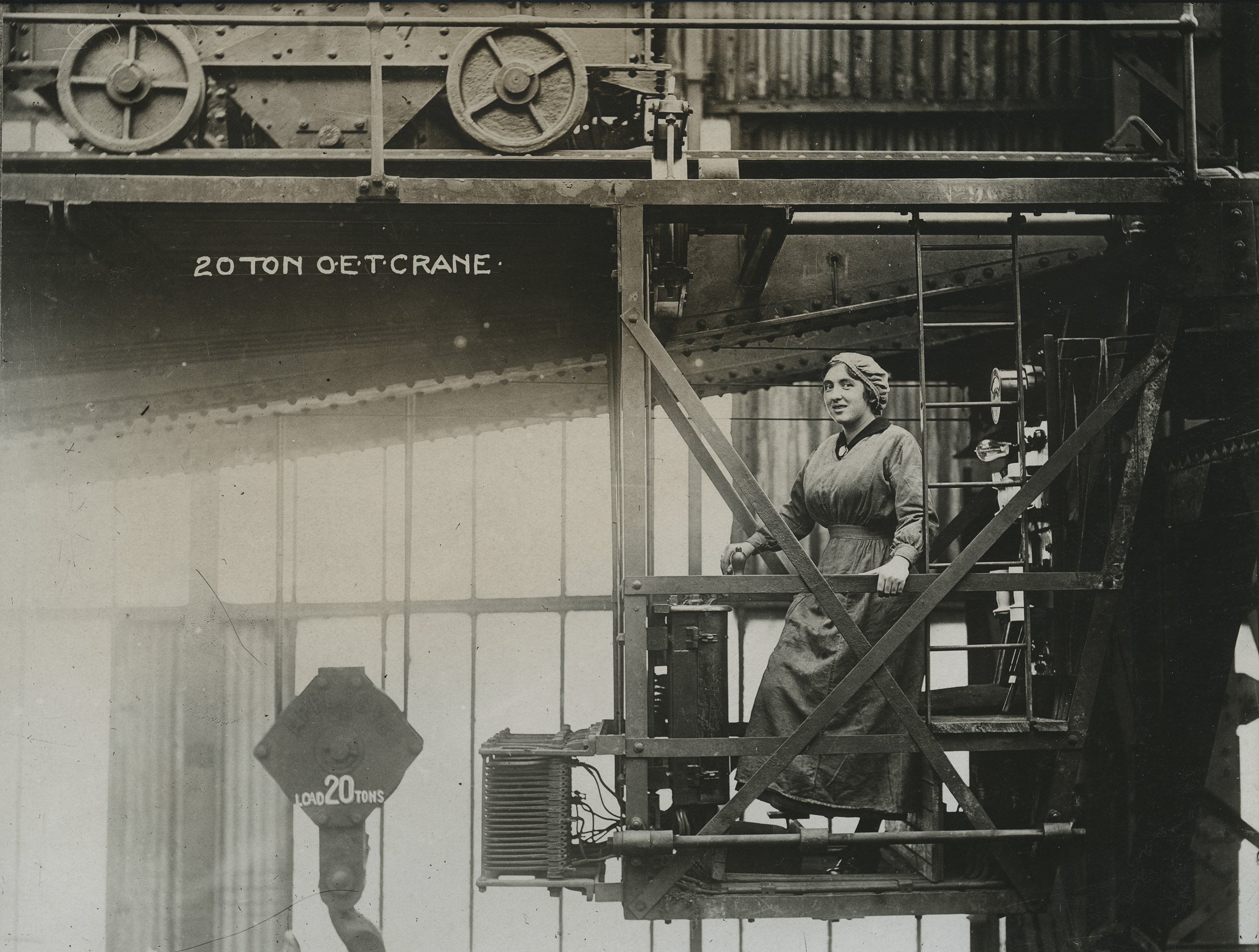
A woman operating a 20-ton EOT crane, 1914

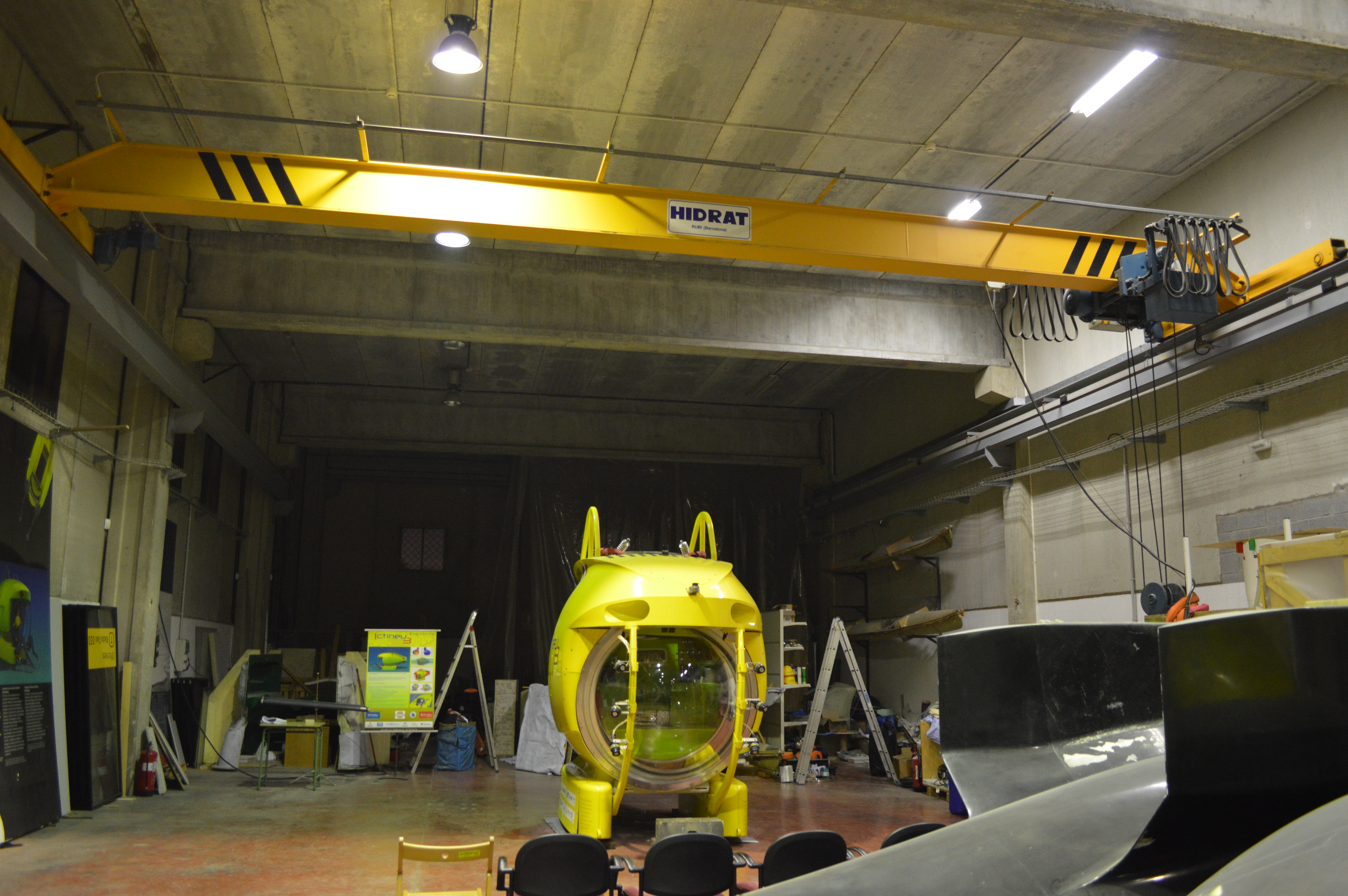
An EOT overhead crane is used to move and build this submersible, the Ictineu 3, in a warehouse of Sant Feliu de Llobregat, Spain.

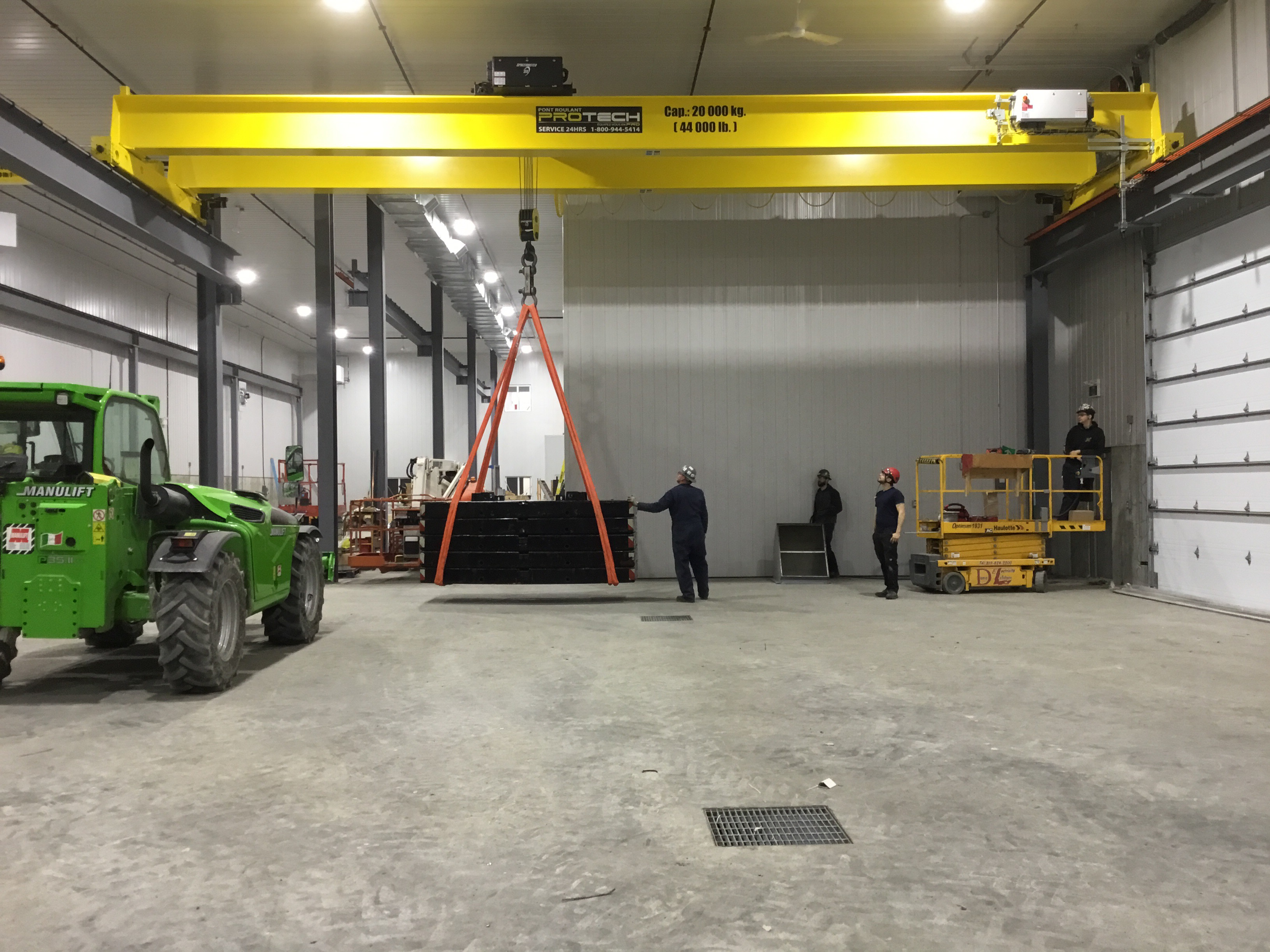
A VFD crane currently performing a load test

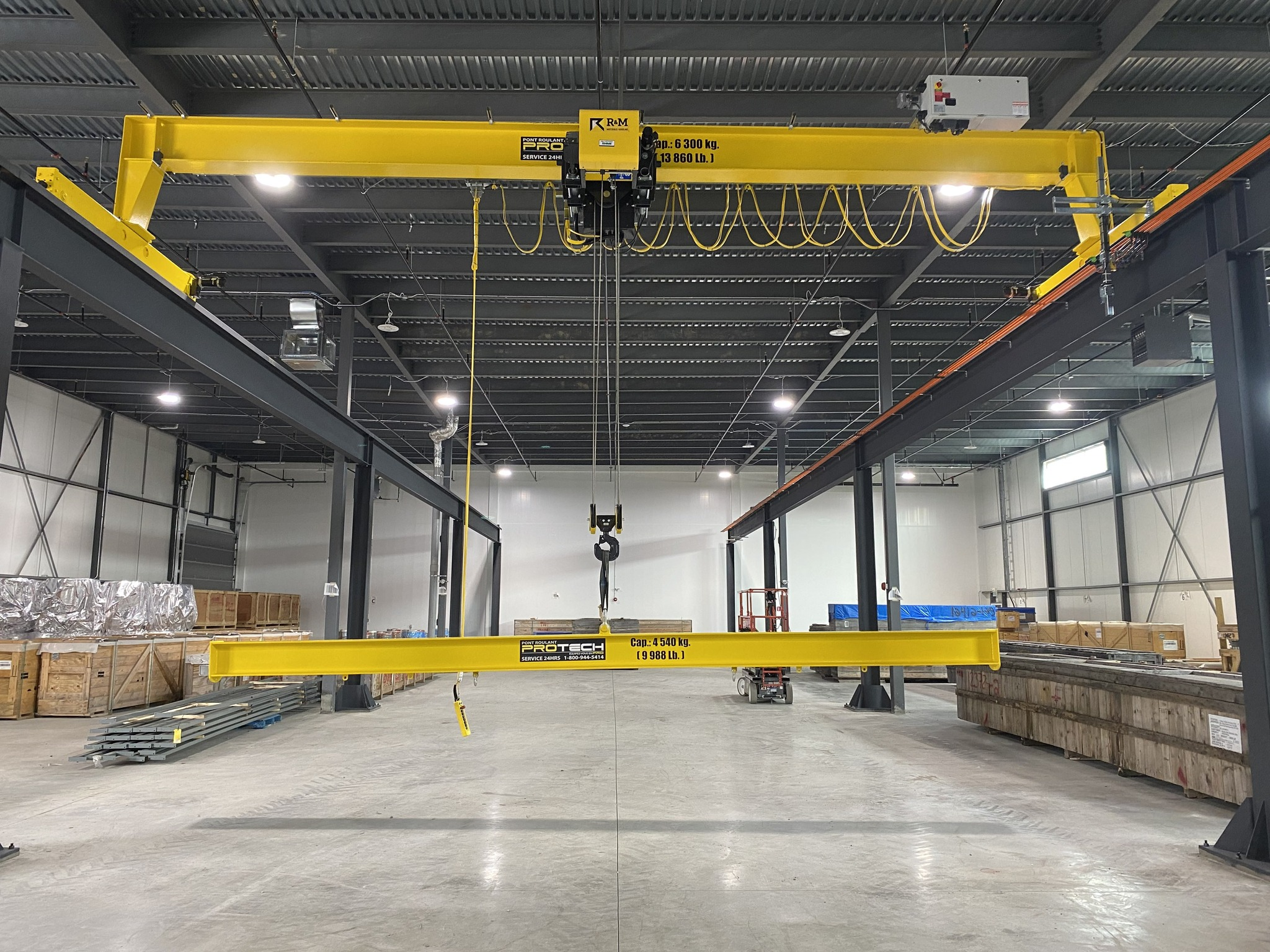
An overhead crane using a lifting beam for a customized application

=== Rotary overhead crane ===
This type of overhead crane has one end of the bridge mounted on a fixed pivot and the other end carried on an annular track; the bridge traverses the circular area beneath. This offers improvement over a jib crane by making possible a longer reach and eliminating lateral strains on the building walls.

=== Polar crane ===
This type of overhead crane has both ends of the bridge mounted on an annular track. The bridge runs to entire diameter of the track, as opposed to just the radius for a rotary crane. Polar cranes are commonly used in containment buildings at nuclear power stations, fitting their circular, steam pressure containing design.

== Gallery ==
Examples of overhead cranes

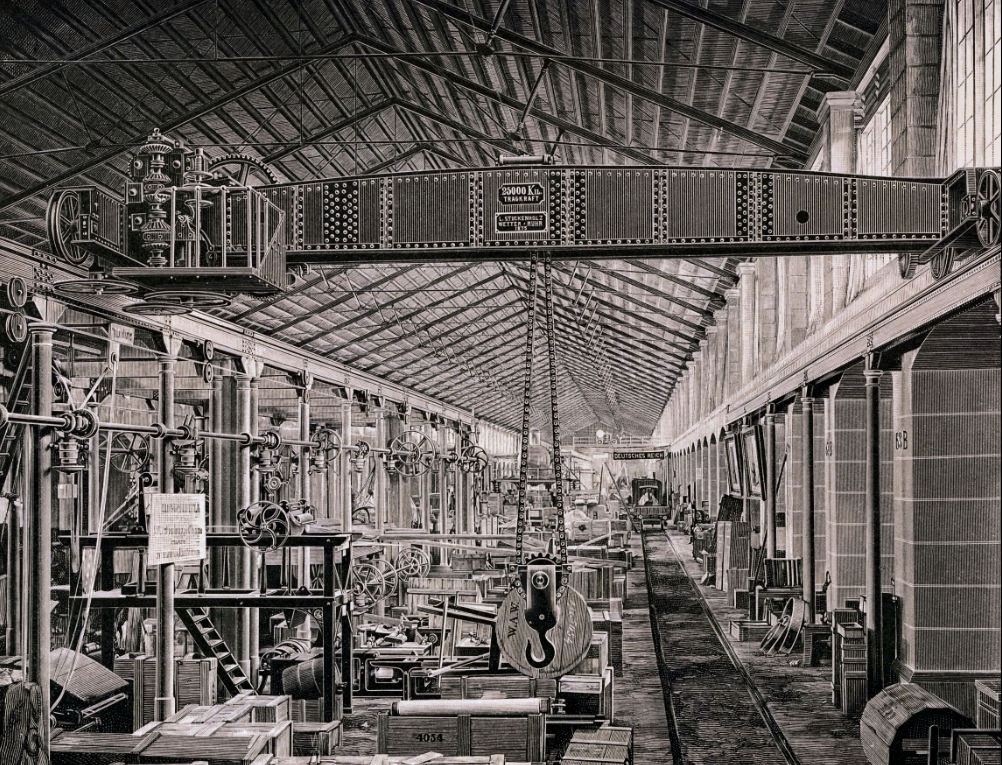
Example of steam powered overhead crane from 1875, produced by Stuckenholz AG, Wetter, Germany. Design developed by Rudolf Bredt from an original installation at Crewe railway works

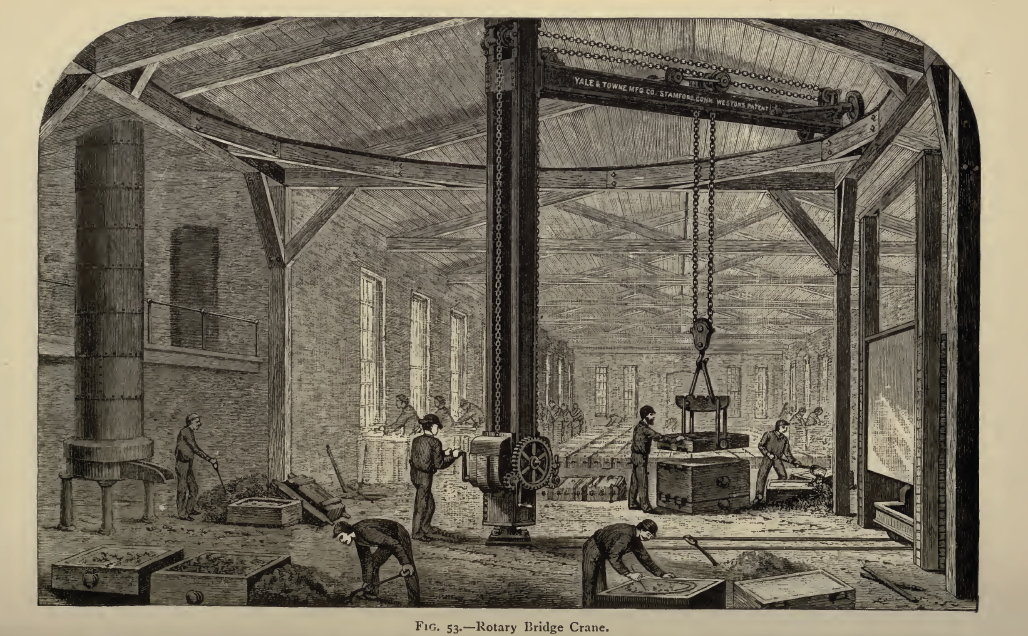
Rotary overhead crane installed in a foundry, c. 1880

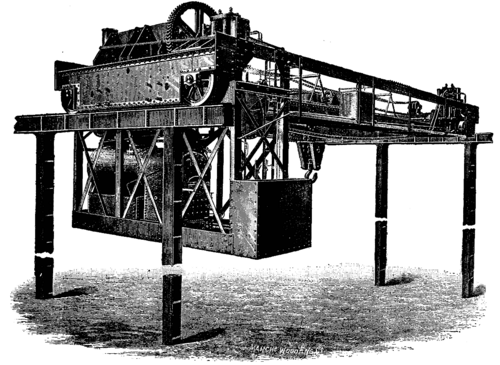
Steam-powered overhead crane from c. 1890. Three separate, two-cylinder engines provided transverse, longitudinal, and hoisting motion; a feature of the design was the ability to raise or lower the load while in transit.

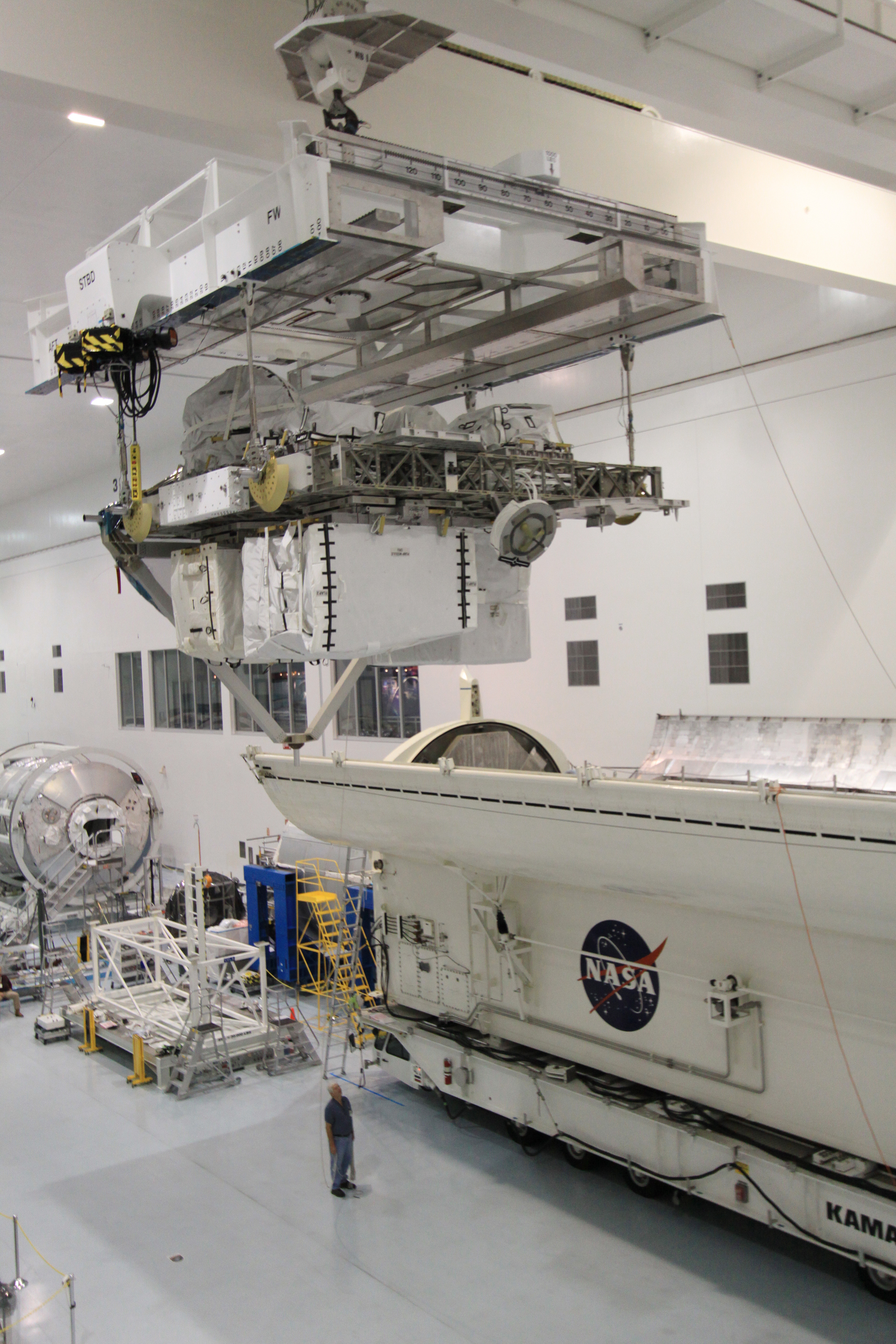
One of two overhead cranes hoisting a space shuttle payload in the Space Station Processing Facility

== See also ==
- Container crane
- Crane (railroad)
- Gantry crane
- EOT crane

== Standards ==
North America

- ASME B30.2: "Overhead and Gantry Cranes (Top Running Bridge, Single or Multiple Girder, Top Running Trolley Hoist)"
- ASME B30.17: "Overhead and Gantry Cranes (Top Running Bridge, Single Girder, Underhung Hoist)"
- ASME B30.11: "Monorails and Underhung Cranes"
- CSA B167 - Overhead cranes, gantry cranes, monorails, hoists, and jib cranes (last updated 2026)
- CMAA 70- Multiple girder cranes (last updated 2025)
- CMAA 74- Single girder cranes (last updated 2025)
- CMAA 78- Technical services (last updated 2025)
- CMAA 79- Crane operator manual (last updated 2025)

International

- BS 466: "Specification for Power driven overhead travelling cranes, semi-goliath and goliath cranes for general use" (1984)
- ISO 4301-5: "Cranes; classification; part 5: overhead travelling and portal bridge cranes" (1991)
- ISO 8686-5: "Cranes; design principles for loads and load combinations; part 5: overhead travelling and portal bridge cranes" (1992)
- Indian Standard – 807
- Indian Standard – 3177
- Indian Standard -4137
- FEM 1.001: "Rules for the Design of Hoisting Appliances"
