= Mark Tribe =

American art historian

- Mark Tribe
- Born: 1966 (age 59–60); San Francisco
- Education: Brown University, University of California, San Diego
- Known for: Conceptual art, installation art, video art

Mark Tribe (born 1966) is an American artist. He is the founder of Rhizome, a not-for-profit arts organization based in New York City.

In 2013, he was appointed chair of the MFA program of the School of Visual Arts in New York City. Formerly, he was Assistant Professor of Modern Culture and Media Studies at Brown University, Director of the Digital Media Center at the Columbia University School of the Arts, and Visiting Assistant Professor and Artist in Residence at Williams College. He is the author of The Port Huron Project: Reenactments of Historic Protest Speeches (Charta, 2010) and the co-author of New Media Art (Taschen, 2006). He received an MFA in Visual Art from the University of California, San Diego in La Jolla, California in 1994 and an BA in Visual Art from Brown University in 1990.

== Work ==
Tribe's drawings, performances, installations and photographs often deal with social and political issues. His work has been featured in solo exhibitions at the Corcoran Gallery of Art in Washington, D.C.; Momenta Art in Brooklyn, New York; Los Angeles Contemporary Exhibitions (LACE) in Los Angeles, California; and DiverseWorks in Houston, Texas. His work has been included in group exhibitions at the New Museum in New York City;, the Queens Museum in New York City; the Palais de Tokyo in Paris; the Menil Collection in Houston; Centre Georges Pompidou in Paris; SITE Santa Fe in Santa Fe, New Mexico; the San Diego Museum of Art in San Diego, California; Museo de Antioquia in Medellin, Colombia; Montclair Art Museum in Montclair, New Jersey; and the DeCordova Museum and Sculpture Park in Lincoln, Massachusetts.

In 1996, Tribe founded Rhizome, a not-for-profit arts organization that supports and provides a platform for new media art. Tribe has curated exhibitions at the New Museum of Contemporary Art in New York City, the Massachusetts Museum of Contemporary Art and inSite_05 in San Diego, California and Tijuana, Mexico.
