= Grant Olney =

American singer-songwriter

Grant Olney Passmore
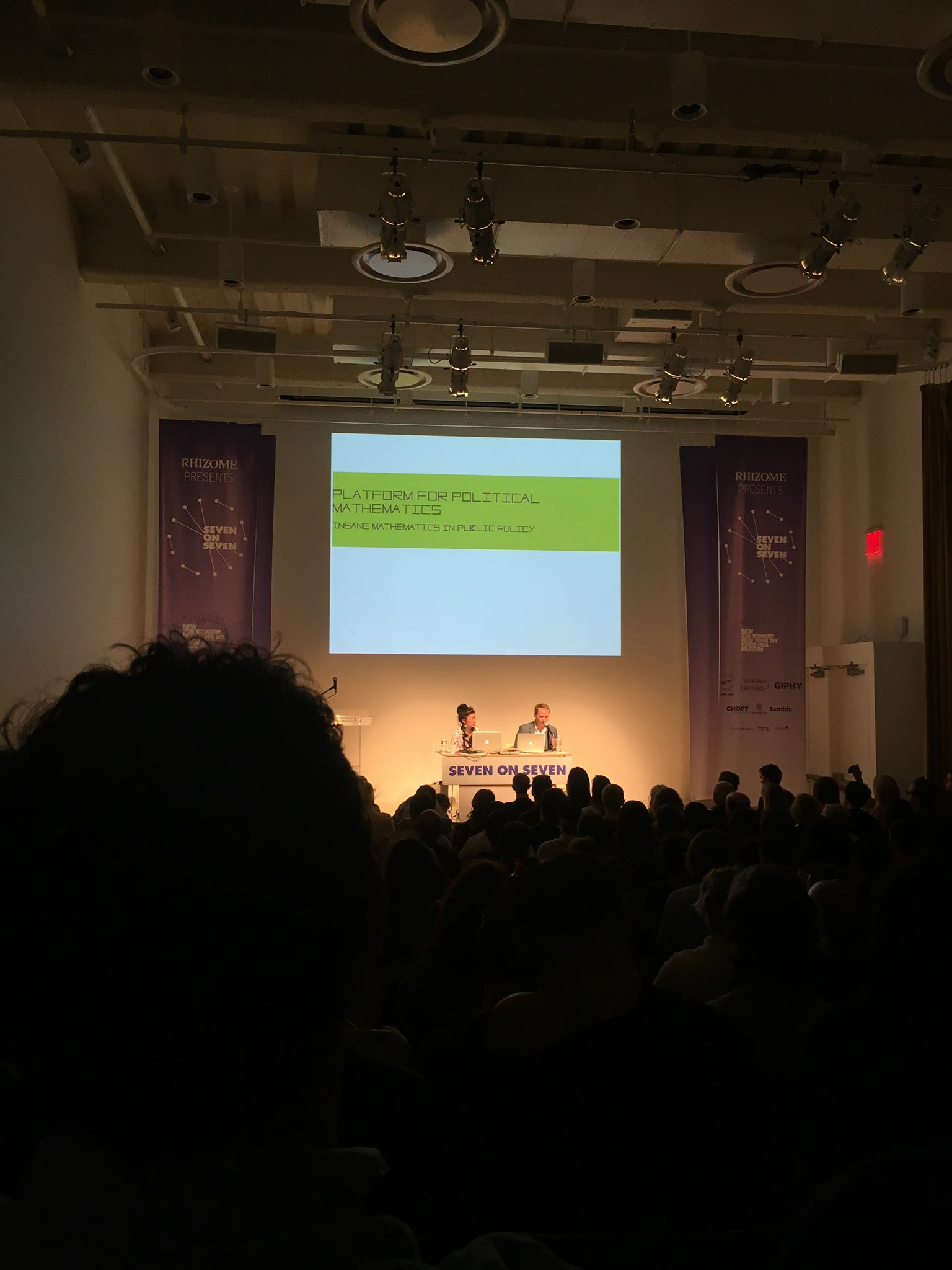
- Grant Passmore and Hito Steyerl presenting their joint work at Rhizome Seven on Seven at the New Museum, May 2016.
- Born: October 18, 1983; USA
- Education: Clare Hall, Cambridge (Postdoc); University of Edinburgh (PhD); Mathematical Research Institute in the Netherlands (Master); University of Texas at Austin (BA)
- Scientific career
- Fields: Theorem proving; Formal verification; Artificial intelligence
- Workplaces: University of Cambridge; University of Edinburgh; Imandra Inc.
- Thesis: Combined Decision Procedures for Nonlinear Arithmetics, Real and Complex (2011)
- Doctoral advisor: Paul B. Jackson
- Musical career
- Also known as: Grant Olney
- Genres: Indie folk, Indie rock
- Occupation: Singer-songwriter
- Years active: 1998–present
- Labels: Asian Man Records, Friendly Police UK
- Website: cl.cam.ac.uk/~gp351/

Grant Olney Passmore (born October 18, 1983) is a singer-songwriter who has recorded on the Asian Man Records label. He is considered part of the New Weird America movement along with David Dondero, Devendra Banhart, Bright Eyes, and CocoRosie. His latest full-length album, Hypnosis for Happiness, was released in July 2013 on the Friendly Police UK label. His previous full-length album, Brokedown Gospel, was released on the Asian Man Records label in July 2004. He also releases music under the pseudonym Scout You Devil and as part of the songwriting duo Olney Clark.

Alongside his music, Passmore is also a mathematician and theoretical computer scientist, formerly a student at the University of Texas at Austin, the Mathematical Research Institute in the Netherlands, and the University of Edinburgh, where he earned his PhD. He is a Life Member of Clare Hall, University of Cambridge and is cofounder of the artificial intelligence company Imandra Inc. (formerly known as Aesthetic Integration) which produces technology for neuro-symbolic AI and the formal verification of algorithms. He was paired with artist Hito Steyerl in the 2016 Rhizome Seven on Seven. Together with Leonardo de Moura and Jeremy Avigad, Passmore was part of the early conception of the Lean theorem prover.

As a young child and early teenager, Passmore was involved in the development of the online Bulletin Board system scene, and under the name skaboy he was the author of many applications of importance to the Bulletin Board System community, including the Infusion Bulletin Board System, Empathy Image Editor, Avenger Packer Pro, and Impulse Tracker Tosser. Passmore was head programmer for ACiD Productions while working on many of these applications.

== Personal life ==
Passmore married Barbara Galletly in 2014. They have three children.

== Discography ==
Albums

- Hypnosis for Happiness – Grant Olney – (2013 · Friendly Police UK)
- Olney Clark – Olney Clark – (2010 · Friendly Police UK)
- Let Love Be (single) – Grant Olney – (2006 · Asian Man Records)
- Brokedown Gospel – Grant Olney – (2004 · Asian Man Records)
- Sweet Wine – Grant Olney – (2003 · MyAutomation Records – Asian Man Records)
- Rough Sketches – Scout You Devil – (2003 · MyAutomation Records)
- The Always – The Record Time – (2002 · MyAutomation Records)
- Almost Always – The Record Time – (2001 · MyAutomation Records)
- Dream in Color Dream in Sound – The Record Time – (2000 · MyAutomation Records)
- The Complete and Total Guide – Substandard – (2000 · Good Guy Records)
- Suburban Dreams – Substandard – (1999 · Good Guy Records)

Compilations

- Underground Screams – Scout You Devil (2003 · Asian Man Records · song: "Night Crimes")
