= Rafaël Rozendaal =

Dutch-Brazilian visual artist (born 1980)

Rafaël Rozendaal (born 1980) is a Dutch-Brazilian visual artist currently living and working in New York City. He is known as a pioneer of Internet Art.

== BYOB ==
Rozendaal founded BYOB (Bring Your Own Beamer), an open source exhibition concept. The idea is that anyone can create an exhibition of media art with or without budget. The manual of BYOB reads: " 1) Find a space, 2) Invite many artists, 3) Ask them to bring their projector." With this concept Rozendaal wanted to bring the internet to a real life physical space and allow viewers to "‘walk through the internet". Since its beginning in 2010, more than 150 BYOB events were organized around the world. In 2011, BYOB was the theme of the II Internet Pavilion for the Venice Biennale

== Selling websites ==
Rozendaal is one of the first artists to sell websites as art objects. His websites are sold to art collectors, who then own the domain name of that given work. Both the artist and the collector sign a contract that the work has to remain publicly accessible. The name of the collector is placed in the source code and the title of the webpage. Rozendaal created the Art Website Sales Contract, which is a public document that can be used by any artist or collector to help in the selling of public website art. In 2013, Rozendaal’s www.ifnoyes.com website sold at an auction at Phillips (auctioneers) in New York for $3,500.

== Abstract Browsing ==
In 2014, Rozendaal released Abstract Browsing, a browser extension that transforms websites into abstract compositions of coloured rectangles while preserving their underlying layouts. He subsequently used images generated by the extension as the basis for large-scale Jacquard-woven tapestries, translating the visual structure of everyday web browsing into physical artworks.

== NFTs (Non-Fungible Tokens) ==
In August 2021 Rozendaal launched an NFT project titled Endless Nameless, which consisted of 1,000 artworks generated by an algorithm on the Ethereum blockchain. Half of the proceeds of the sale were donated to the arts nonprofit Rhizome, resulting in a donation of 164 Ether (approximately $430,000 at time of donation). This is the largest private donation in Rhizome's history.

== Collections ==
- Museum of Modern Art
- Stedelijk Museum Amsterdam
- Towada Art Center
- Whitney Museum

== Publications ==
- 2022: 81 Horizons
- 2020: Home Alone
- 2019: Haiku Rafaël Rozendaal
- 2017: Everything Always Everywhere
- 2016: Haiku Rafaël Rozendaal
- 2015: Haiku Rafaël Rozendaal
- 2013 Spheres Rafaël Rozendaal
- 2011: Domain Names 2010 - 2001
- 2010: Big Long Now
- 2003: I Am Very Very Sorry
