= Crane Manufacturers Association of America =

Logo of the Crane Manufacturers Association of America.

The Crane Manufacturers Association of America, Inc. (CMAA) is an independent trade association in the United States. It is affiliated with the United States Division of Material Handling Industry. The voluntary association was incorporated as the CMAA in 1955.

== Overview ==
Member companies represent industry leaders in the overhead crane market, serve the United States market from operations based in the United States, Canada, and Mexico. CMAA, formerly the Electric Overhead Crane Institute, is an incorporated organization of leading electric overhead traveling crane manufacturers in the United States and an affiliate of Material Handling Industry.

== History ==
Leading crane manufacturers founded the Electric Overhead Crane Institute, or EOCI, in 1927 to promote standardization of cranes in both quality and performance, which is the root of CMAA. After publishing specifications in 1949 and 1961 of EOCI 61, CMAA’s Engineering Committee continued to propose specifications of CMAA 70, CMAA 74, CMAA 78, the last of which are Standards and Guidelines for Professional Services Performed on Overhead and Travelling Cranes and Associated Hoisting Equipment. Re-released in 2003, CMAA engineering committee published the Crane Operators Manual, as well as the Operational Guide for Lifting Devices in 2006. Members meet twice a year to update and review its publications.

== Current Officers ==
President - Josh Arwood - Ace Industries, Inc.
Vice President - Karen Norheim - American Crane
Vice President of Engineering - Jeff Griesemer - American Crane
Assistant Vice President of Engineering - Bob Kotel - Yale Hoists, division of Columbus McKinnon
Past President - Bill Schneider Jr. - SISSCO Material Handling

== Publications ==
- Specification No. 70 Multiple Girder Cranes
- Specification No. 74 Single Girder Cranes
- Specification No. 78 Professional Services - This sets the standards for those who inspect, repair, design, and otherwise manage the supply and use of overhead cranes.
- Specification No. 79 Crane Operators Manual
- Overhead Crane Inspection and Maintenance Checklist
- CMAA Buyers’ Guide
