= Kristin Lucas =

American multimedia and performance artist

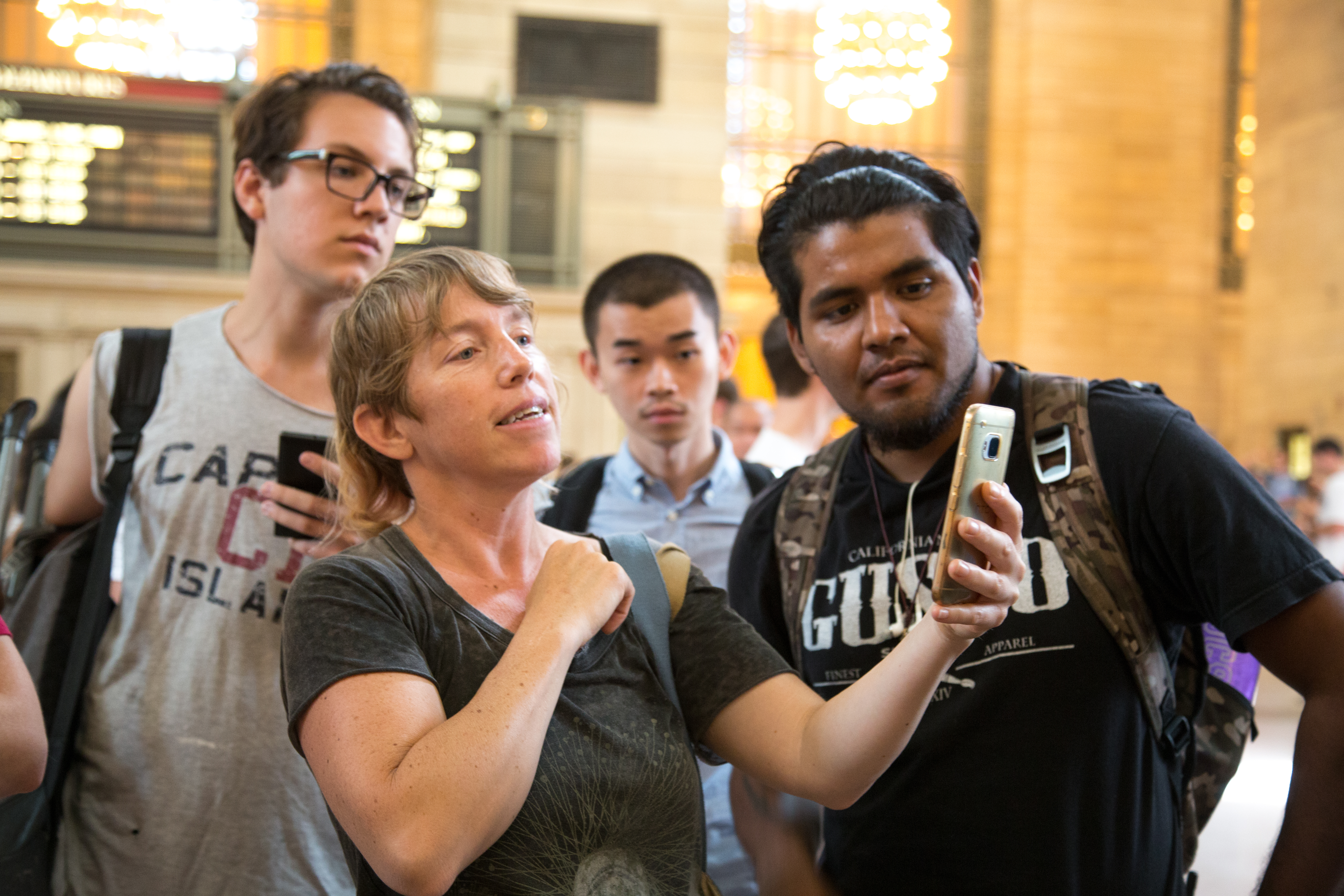
- Born: 1968 (age 57–58); Davenport, Iowa
- Education: MFA Stanford University, BFA Cooper Union
- Known for: Performance art and video art

Kristin Lucas is a media artist who works in video, performance, installation and on the Internet. Her work explores the impacts of technology on humanity, blurring the boundary between the technological and corporeal. In her work she frequently casts herself as the protagonist in videos and performances where her interactions with technology lead to isolation, and physical and mental contamination.

== Career and education ==
Lucas has degrees in art from Cooper Union and Stanford University. She has a technical director at American Cyborg in New York and is on the art faculty at the University of Texas at Austin.

== Work ==
A key theme in Lucas' work is the blurring boundary between humanity and technology and the relationship between technology and disease. Her character often presents a diseased body to be diagnosed by technology. In Whatever Your Mind Can Conceive (2007), her character grows digital sores on her skin. She explored this theme in her 2007 work Change of Name, where she legally changed her name to the same name. When she went before the judge at the hearing, she poetically used words like "refresh" "empty my cache" and "reboot." This work has been called an "ontological intervention" that negotiates the boundary "between the body and the machine." Identity exchange appeared again in her and Andrew Kortina's contribution to Rhizome at the New Museum's Seven on Seven project, where they proposed using Twitter as an interface for swapping identities.

Lucas' work has been commissioned by the Dia Art Foundation, and is in the collection of the Museum of Modern Art. Her videos are distributed by Electronic Arts Intermix and her work is represented by Postmasters. Lucas was an Eyebeam resident in 2013.
