= Eyes of Things =

Information
- Funding agency: European Commission
- Framework Programme: Horizon 2020
- Project type: Innovation Action
- Participants: University of Castilla–La Mancha, AWAIBA, Movidius, THALES, DFKI, Fluxguide, Evercam, nVISO
- Start: January 2015
- End: June 2018
- Website: https://eyesofthings.eu

Eyes of Things (EoT) is the name of a project funded by the European Union’s Horizon 2020 Research and Innovation Programme under grant agreement number 643924. The purpose of the project, which is funded under the Smart Cyber-physical systems topic, is to develop a generic hardware-software platform for embedded, efficient (i.e. battery-operated, wearable, mobile), computer vision, including deep learning inference.

On November 29, 2018, the European Space Agency announced that it was testing the suitability of the device for space applications in advance of a flight in a Cubesat.

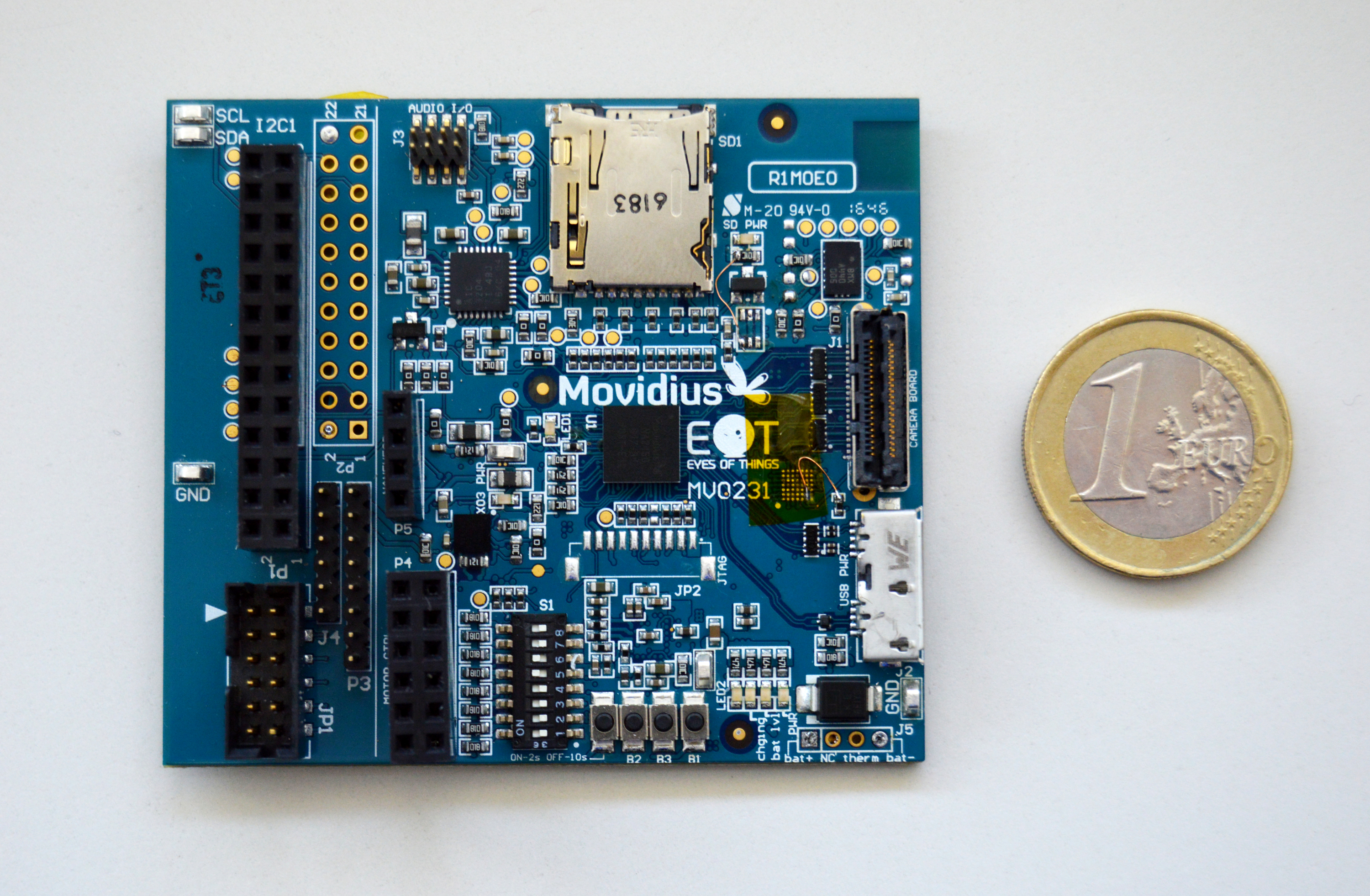
Eyes of Things board

== Motivation ==
EoT is based on the following tenets:

- Future embedded systems will have more intelligence and cognitive functionality. Vision is paramount to such intelligent capacity
- Unlike other sensors, vision requires intensive processing. Power consumption must be optimized if vision is to be used in mobile and wearable applications
- Cloud processing of edge-captured images is not sustainable. The sheer amount of visual data generated cannot be transferred to the cloud. Bandwidth is not sufficient and cloud servers cannot cope with it.

== Partners ==
- VISILAB group at University of Castilla–La Mancha (Coordinator)
- Movidius
- Awaiba
- Thales Security Solutions & Systems
- DFKI
- Fluxguide
- Evercam
- nVISO

== Awards ==
- 2019 Electronic Component and Systems Innovation Award by the European Commission
- 2018 HiPEAC Tech Transfer Award
- 2018 EC Innovation Radar - highlighting excellent innovations Award
- 2018 Internet of Things (IoT) Technology Research Award Pilot by Google
- 2016 Semifinalist "THE VISION SHOW STARTUP COMPETITION", Global Association for Vision Information, Boston US

== See also ==
- Wearable camera
- Computer vision
- Internet of Things
- Embedded systems
- Edge computing
