= List of filename extensions (F–L) =

This alphabetical list of filename extensions contains extensions of notable file formats used by multiple notable applications or services.

== F ==
Ext.	Description	Used by
F	Forth language source code file	Forth development systems
F	Fortran language source code file (in fixed form)	Many Fortran compilers
F01	Fax	perfectfax
F03	Fortran language source code file (in free form)	Many Fortran compilers
F08	Fortran language source code file (in free form)	Fortran compilers
F18	Fortran language source code file (in free form)	Fortran compilers
F4	Fortran IV source code file	Fortran IV source code
F4V	A container format for Flash Video that differs from the older FLV file format (see also SWF)	Adobe Flash
F77	Fortran language source code file (in fixed form)	Many Fortran compilers
F90	Fortran language source code file (in free form)	Many Fortran compilers
F95	Fortran language source code file (in free form)	Many Fortran compilers
FA	FASTA format sequence file	
FAA	FASTA format amino acid	
FACTOR	Factor source file	
FASTA	FASTA format sequence file	
FASTQ	FASTQ format sequence file	
FB	Forth language block file	Forth development systems
FB2	FictionBook e-book 2.0 file (DRM-free XML format)	e-book readers
FBX	3D model geometry, material textures, lighting, armature, and animation sequences for inter application use/transport	Autodesk, Blender
FCHK	Gaussian-formatted checkpoint file. Used to store result of quantum chemistry calculation results.	
FCS	FCS molecular biology format.	
FEN	Forsyth–Edwards Notation	Chess applications -text data describes a specific position.
FF	Farbfeld image	
FFAPX	FrontFace plugin file	FrontFace digital signage software
FFN	FASTA format nucleotide of gene regions	
FIT	CurvFit Input file format	CurvFit software
FITS	Flexible Image Transport System	astronomy software
FLAC	Audio codec, Audio file format	
FLAME	Fractal configuration file	Apophysis
FLP	FL Studio project file	FL Studio
FLV	A container format for Flash Video (see also SWF)	Adobe Flash
FMF	Football Manager editor data file; contains custom databases usable in the Football Manager games	Football Manager
FMU	A Functional Mockup Unit (FMU) implements the Functional Mockup Interface (FMI).	
FNA	FASTA format nucleic acid	
FNI	FileNet Native Document	FileNet
FNX	Saved notes with formatting in markup language	FeatherNote
FODG	OpenDocument Flat XML Drawings and vector graphics	OpenDocument, LibreOffice, Collabora Online
FODP	OpenDocument Flat XML Presentations	OpenDocument, LibreOffice, Collabora Online
FODS	OpenDocument Flat XML Spreadsheets	OpenDocument, LibreOffice, Collabora Online
FODT	OpenDocument Flat XML Text Document	OpenDocument, LibreOffice, Collabora Online
FOR	Fortran language source file	many
FQL	Fauna Query Language source file	Fauna
FREQ	Match-n-Freq (TM) Input file format	Match-n-Freq software
FRAG	Fragment File, usually stored on MOVPKG files	MOVPKG
FRM	MySQL Database Metadata	MySQL
FRQ7	Match-n-Freq (TM) version 7+ Input file format	Match-n-Freq software
FS	F# source file	F# compilers
FS	Forth language source code file (often used to distinguish from .fb)	Forth development systems
FSB	FMOD Soundbanks (compressed data container)	FMOD
FTH	Forth language source code file	Forth development systems

== G ==
Ext.	Description	Used by
G4	ANTLR4 grammar	ANTLR4
G6	Graph6 graph data format. Used for storing undirected graphs.	
GB	GenBank molecular biology format.	
GBK	same as GB	
GBR	Gerber format	PCB CAD/CAM
GBX	Files used by Nadeo's GameBox engine	TrackMania
GDF	General Data Format for Biomedical Signals	Biomedical signal processing, Brain Computer Interfaces
GDSCRIPT	Godot (game engine) Script File	Godot (game engine)
GDT	Gerätedatentransfer, an xDT application	Healthcare providers in Germany
GED	GEDCOM	Genealogy data exchange
GEOJSON	GeoJSON is specified by RFC 7946.	
GEOTIFF	Used for archiving and exchanging aerial photography or terrain data.	
GGB	GeoGebra File	GeoGebra
GIF	Compuserves' Graphics Interchange Format (bitmapped graphics)	QPeg - Display - CompuShow
glTF	3D computer graphics	Khronos Group
GM9	Scripts for GodMode9	Godmode9
GMEZ	GameMaker Extension File	GameMaker
GMI	Gemtext markup language	Gemini (Protocol)
GMK	GameMaker Project File	YoYo Games
GML	Geography Markup Language File	Geography Markup Language
GML	Used for the storage and exchange of graphs. Native format of the Graphlet graph editor software.	
GML	GameMaker Script File	GameMaker
GO	Go source code file	Go (Programming language)
GODOT	Godot (game engine) Project File	Godot (game engine)
GOHTML	Go HTML template file	Go (Programming language)
GPX	GPS eXchange Format	
GRAPHML	GraphML is an acronym derived from Graph Markup Language. Represents typed, attributed, directed, and undirected graphs.	
GRB	Commonly used in meteorology to store historical and forecast weather data. Represents numerical weather prediction output (NWP).	
GREXLI	Uncompressed folder as a file	WinGrex/GrexliLib
GRIB	same as GRB	
GRP	Data pack files for the Build Engine	Duke Nukem 3D
GSF	Generic sensor format	Used for storing bathymetry data, such as that gathered by a multibeam echosounder.
GTF	Gene transfer format	
GV	Graph Visualization	Graphviz
GW	same as .lgr. See LGR below for details on LEDA (.gw, .lgr).	
GXL	GXL is an acronym derived from Graph Exchange Language. Represents typed, attributed, directed, and undirected graphs.	
GZ	gzip compressed data	gzip
GSLIDES	Google Slides presentation, usually found in Google Drive	

== H ==
Ext.	Description	Used by
H!	On-line help file	Flambeaux Help! Display Engine
H!	Pertext database	HELP.EXE
H--	C-- language header	Sphinx C--
H	Header file (usually C language)	Watcom C/C++
H++	Header file	C++
HA	Archive	HA
HACK	Source file for the programming language hack	The HHVM
HAR	HTTP Archive format (JSON-format web-browser log)	W3C draft standard
HDF	General-purpose format for representing multidimensional datasets. Developed by the US National Center for Supercomputing Applications (NCSA).	
HDF5	General-purpose format for representing multidimensional datasets and images. Incompatible with HDF Version 4 and earlier.	
HDI	Hard Disk Image file (PC-9800 disk image file)	PC-9800 emulators
HDMP	heap dumpfile	
HEIC	HEIF raster image and compression format. Commonly used for storing still or animated images.	
HEIF	same as HEIC.	
HH	C++ header file	
HIF	HEIF format extension on Nikon cameras. Short name imposed by DCF.	
HIN	HyperChem HIN format. Used in cheminformatics applications and on the web for storing and exchanging 3D molecule models. Maintained by HyperCube, Inc.	
HOF	Basic Configuration file	OMSI The Bus Simulator
HOI4	Hearts Of Iron 4 file	Hearts Of Iron 4 Save game
HPP	C++ header file	Zortech C++ - Watcom C/C++
HTA	HTML Application	Microsoft Windows
HTM	see HTML	
HTML	Hypertext Markup Language (WWW)	Netscape - Mosaic - many
HUM	3D Model database	OMSI The Bus Simulator
HXX	C++ header file	

== I ==
Ext.	Description	Used by
IC	Infinite Craft save file	Infinite Craft, Infinibrowser
ICAL	same as ICS (see below).	
ICC	ICC profile	Color Configuration for color input or output devices
ICE	LHA Archive	Cracked LHA (old LHA), Total Commander
ICL	Icon library	Microsoft Windows
ICNS	Macintosh icons format. Raster image file format.	
ICO	Icon file	ICONEDIT.EXE; Microsoft Windows
ICS	ICS iCalendar format. Used for the storage and exchange of calendar information. Commonly used in personal information management systems.	
IFB	Same as ICS (see above).	
IFC	Industry Foundation Classes (platform neutral, open file format used by BIM software). It is registered by ISO and is an official International Standard ISO 16739-1:2018.	BIM software
IGC	Flight tracks downloaded from GPS devices in the International Gliding Commission's prescribed format	
IGES	Initial Graphics Exchange Specification	
IMG	Disk image	
INFO	Texinfo hypertext document	Texinfo, info (Unix), Emacs
INI	Configuration file	
IO	Archive	CPIO
IOS	Game code for GameMaker games	GameMaker
IPT	XnView IPTC template	XnView, XnViewMP
IPTRACE	AIX iptrace captures dualhome.iptrace (AIX iptrace) Shows Ethernet and Token Ring packets captured in the same file.	WireShark
IQBLOCKS	Main file for programming a VEX Robot	VEX Robotics
IRX	"IOP Relocatable eXecutable". Library files to dynamically link application code to the Input/Output Processor on the PS2 to communicate with devices like memory cards, USB devices, etc.	Sony PlayStation 2
ISO	ISO-9660 table	see: List of ISO image software
ISS	Inno Setup Script	Inno Setup
IT	Impulse Tracker music file	Impulse Tracker

== J ==
Ext.	Description	Used by
JL	Julia script file	Julia (programming language)
J2C	JPEG 2000 image	JPEG 2000
J2K	JPEG2000 raster image and compression format. Can store images as an array of rectangular tiles that are encoded separately.	
JAR	Java archive	JAR, Java Games and Applications
JAV	see JAVA	
JAVA	Java source code file	
JBEAM	A JSON-based file used in the game BeamNG.drive to define the physics skeleton of a vehicle's soft-body physics	BeamNG.drive
JBIG	Joint Bilevel Image Group	
JCM	same as JDX (see below).	
JDX	Chemical spectroscopy format. JCAMP is an acronym derived from Joint Committee on Atomic and Molecular Physical Data.	
JNLP	Java Network Launching Protocol	Java Web Start
JP2	JPEG 2000 image	
JPE	Joint Photographic Experts Group graphics file format	Minolta/Konica Minolta cameras use this for JPEGs in Adobe RGB color space
JPEG	Joint Photographic Experts Group graphics file format	QPeg - FullView - Display
JPG	Joint Photographic Group	various (Minolta/Konica Minolta cameras use this for JPEGs in sRGB color space)
JS	JavaScript file	script in HTML pages
JSON	JSON (JavaScript Object Notation)	Ajax
JSP	Jakarta Server Pages	Dynamic pages running Web servers using Java technology
JUMP	Beyond Jump save file	Cell to Singularity
JVX	JavaView 3D geometry format. The native format of the JavaView visualization software. Used for the visualization of 2D or 3D geometries. Can be embedded in web pages and viewed with the JavaView applet.	
JXL	JPEG XL raster graphics file	

== K ==
Ext.	Description	Used by
KEXTRACTION	Keka Extraction Package	Keka
KEY	Keynote Presentation	Keynote
KFN	KaraFun	KaraFun Player 2
KLC	MSKLC Source file	Microsoft Keyboard Layout Creator
KML	Keyhole Markup Language	Google Earth
KMZ	Keyhole Markup Language (Zip compressed)	Google Earth
KO	Linux kernel module format system file	Linux
KRA	Krita image file	Krita
KRABER	Kraber source code file	Kraber Programming Language
KSH	Kornshell source file	Kornshell
KT	Kotlin source code file	Kotlin language
KV	Kivy	

== L ==
Ext.	Description	Used by
LABEL	Dymo label file	Dymo desktop software
LATEX	LaTeX typesetting system and programming language. Commonly used for typesetting mathematical and scientific publications.	
LBR	.LBR Archive	for CP/M and MS-DOS using the LU program
LDB	.LDB Leveldb data file	Google key-value storage library
LDB	.LDB MDB Database lock file	Microsoft Access Database
LDT	Labordatenträger, an xDT application	Healthcare providers in Germany
LGR	LEDA graph data format. Commonly used exchange format for graphs. Stores a single, typed, directed, or undirected graph. Native graph file format of the LEDA graph library and the GraphWin application. LEDA is an acronym for Library of Efficient Datatypes and Algorithms.	
LHA	LHA Archive	LHA/LHARC, Total Commander
LISP	LISP source code file	
LL	LLVM Assembly Language	llvm
LM	Language Model File	Microsoft Windows
LMD	FCS molecular biology format.	
LNK	Local file shortcut	Microsoft Windows
LOGICX	Logic Pro files	Logic Pro (macOS, iPadOS)
LRC	Lyrics file	Lyrics for karaoke-related system and program
LUA	Lua script file	Lua language
LWO	Native format of the LightWave 3D rendering and animation software. LWO is an acronym for LightWave Object. Developed by NewTek. Stores 3D objects as a collection of polygons and their properties.	
LZ	Archive	Lzip

== See also ==
- List of filename extensions
- List of file formats
