= Electric overhead traveling crane =

Type of overhead crane

Electric overhead traveling cranes or EOT cranes are a common type of overhead crane, also called bridge cranes. They consist of parallel runways, much akin to rails of a railroad, with a traveling bridge spanning the gap. EOT cranes are specifically powered by electricity.

== Applications ==
EOT cranes are extensively used in warehouses and industry. An EOT crane is able to carry heavy objects to anywhere needed on the factory floor, and can also be used for lifting. However, it cannot be used in every industry. The working temperature is to limited to a range between -20°C to 40°C.

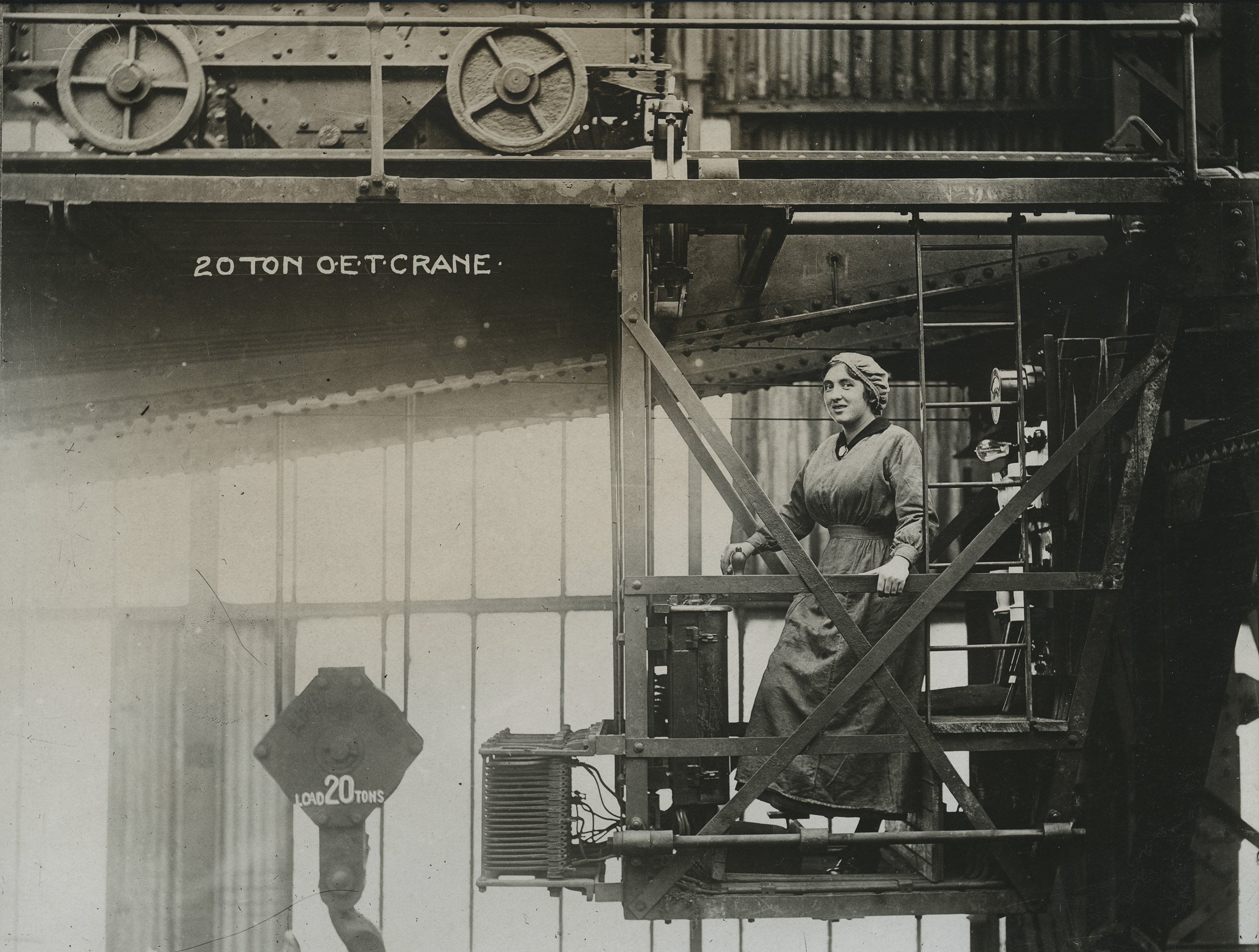
A woman operating a 20-ton EOT crane, 1914

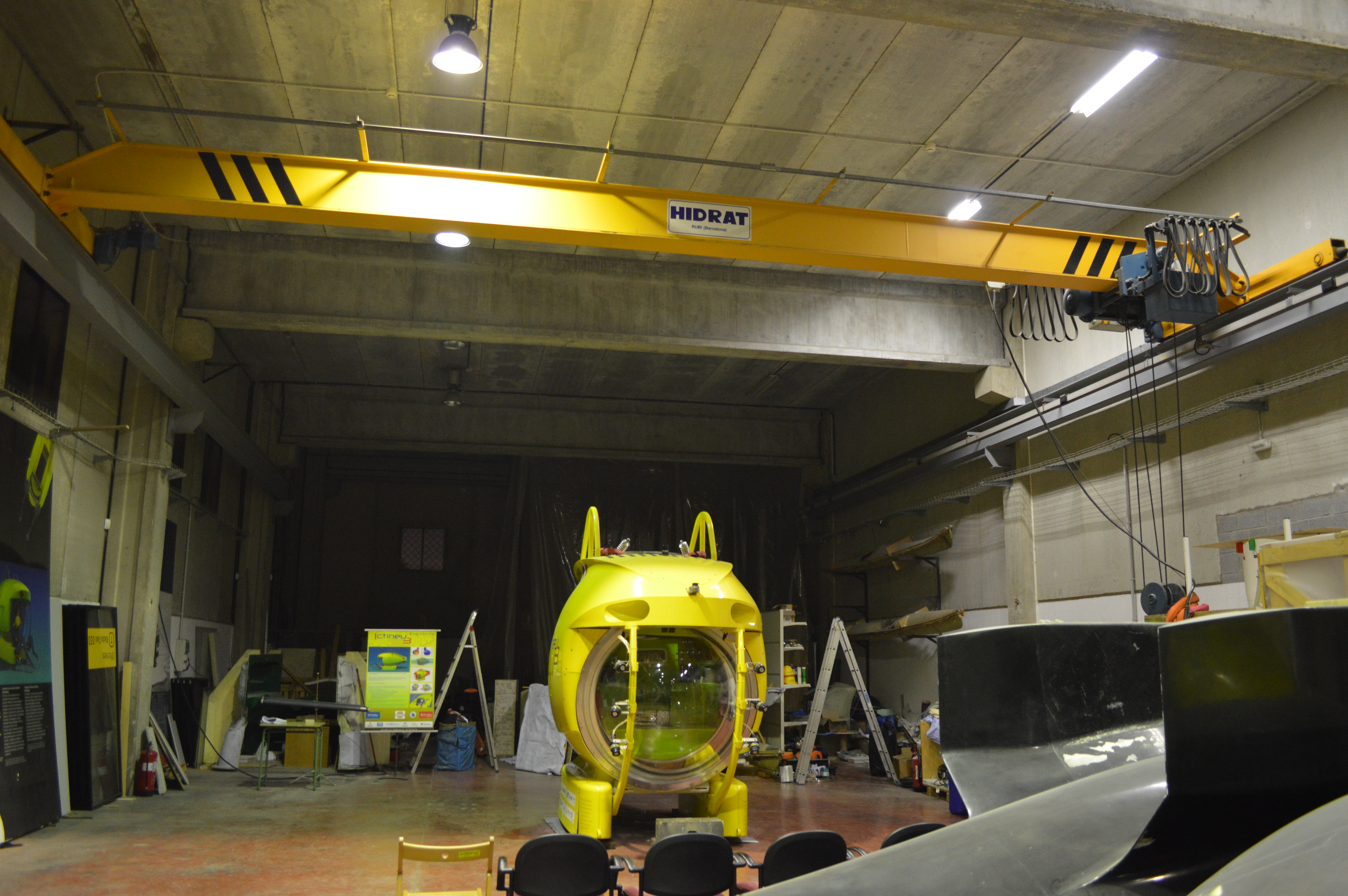
An EOT overhead crane is used to move and build this submersible, the Ictineu 3, in a warehouse of Sant Feliu de Llobregat.

=== Single girder EOT crane ===
A single girder EOT crane has one main girder, making it easy to install, and requires less maintenance. The most common single girder EOT cranes are as follows:

- LD type single girder EOT crane
- LDP type single girder EOT crane and
- HD type single girder EOT crane

It is used for lighter industrial applications as it has lower weight limits.

=== Double girder EOT crane ===
- QD type hook double bridge crane
- LH electric hoist double girder bridge crane
- NLH type double girder EOT crane
