= Silicon oxide =

Silicon oxide may refer to either of the following:

- Silicon dioxide or quartz, SiO_{2}, very well characterized
- Silicon monoxide, SiO, not very well characterized
