= HAR (file format) =

JSON-formatted archive file format

The HTTP Archive format, or HAR, is a JSON-formatted archive file format for logging of a web browser's interaction with a site. The common extension for these files is .har. The format is used, among other tools, by the HTTP Archive project to collect and analyze web performance data.

The format is specified as JSON in UTF-8 encoding; a byte-order mark may be written and must be ignored by readers. The root object is named log and requires a version and a creator field. The specification was a draft that was never published as a W3C Recommendation.

== Support ==
The HAR format is supported by various software, including:

- Charles Proxy
- Chromium
- Fiddler
- Firebug
- Firefox
- Google Chrome
- LoadRunner
- Microsoft Edge
- Postman
- Safari

== See also ==
- WARC
- MHT
