= Bracket =

Punctuation mark

Brackets
()	[]
brackets (BrE)	square brackets (BrE)
round brackets (BrE)	brackets (AmE)
parentheses (AmE)
{}	⟨⟩
braces	angle brackets
curly braces	chevrons
curly brackets (BrE)

A bracket is either of two tall fore- or back-facing punctuation marks commonly used to isolate a segment of text or data from its surroundings. They come in four main pairs of shapes, as given in the box to the right, which also gives their names, that vary between British and American English. Brackets, without further qualification, in British English refers to the (...) marks and in American English the [...] marks.

Other symbols are repurposed as brackets in specialist contexts, such as those used by linguists.

Brackets are typically deployed in symmetric pairs, and an individual bracket may be identified as a left or right bracket or, alternatively, an opening or closing bracket, respectively, depending on the directionality of the context.

In casual writing and in some technical fields, such as computing and linguistic analysis, of grammar, brackets nest, with segments of bracketed material containing embedded within them other further bracketed sub-segments. The number of opening brackets matches the number of closing brackets in such cases.

Various forms of brackets are used in mathematics, with specific mathematical meanings, often for denoting specific mathematical functions and subformulas.

== History ==
Angle brackets, or chevrons, ⟨ ⟩, were the earliest type of bracket to appear in written English. Erasmus coined the term lunula to refer to the round brackets, or (American English) parentheses, ( ), recalling the shape of the crescent moon (Latin: luna).

Most typewriters only had the left and right round brackets. Square brackets appeared with some teleprinters.

Braces (curly brackets) first became part of a character set with the 8-bit code of the IBM 7030 Stretch.

In 1961, ASCII contained parentheses, square, and curly brackets, and also less-than and greater-than signs that could be used as angle brackets.

== Typography ==
In English, typographers mostly prefer not to set brackets in italics, even when the enclosed text is italic. However, in other languages like German, if brackets enclose text in italics, they are usually also set in italics.

== Parentheses, or round brackets ==
Parenthesis
( )
- parentheses (AE)
- brackets (BE)
- round brackets (BE)

In Unicode
- General purpose (half-width): U+0028 ( LEFT PARENTHESIS (&lpar;); U+0029 ) RIGHT PARENTHESIS (&rpar;); General purpose (full-width East Asian): U+FF08 （ FULLWIDTH LEFT PARENTHESIS; U+FF09 ） FULLWIDTH RIGHT PARENTHESIS; Arabic script (Quranic quotations): U+FD3E ﴾ ORNATE LEFT PARENTHESIS; U+FD3F ﴿ ORNATE RIGHT PARENTHESIS; Medieval studies: U+2E28 ⸨ LEFT DOUBLE PARENTHESIS; U+2E29 ⸩ RIGHT DOUBLE PARENTHESIS; Technical: U+207D ⁽ SUPERSCRIPT LEFT PARENTHESIS; U+207E ⁾ SUPERSCRIPT RIGHT PARENTHESIS; U+208D ₍ SUBSCRIPT LEFT PARENTHESIS; U+208E ₎ SUBSCRIPT RIGHT PARENTHESIS; U+239B ⎛ LEFT PARENTHESIS UPPER HOOK; U+239C ⎜ LEFT PARENTHESIS EXTENSION; U+239D ⎝ LEFT PARENTHESIS LOWER HOOK; U+239E ⎞ RIGHT PARENTHESIS UPPER HOOK; U+239F ⎟ RIGHT PARENTHESIS EXTENSION; U+23A0 ⎠ RIGHT PARENTHESIS LOWER HOOK; U+23DC ⏜ TOP PARENTHESIS (&OverParenthesis;); U+23DD ⏝ BOTTOM PARENTHESIS (&UnderParenthesis;); U+27EE ⟮ MATHEMATICAL LEFT FLATTENED PARENTHESIS; U+27EF ⟯ MATHEMATICAL RIGHT FLATTENED PARENTHESIS; U+2983 ⦃ LEFT WHITE CURLY BRACKET; U+2984 ⦄ RIGHT WHITE CURLY BRACKET; U+2985 ⦅ LEFT WHITE PARENTHESIS (&lopar;); U+2986 ⦆ RIGHT WHITE PARENTHESIS (&ropar;); Phonetic punctuation: U+2E59 ⹙ TOP HALF LEFT PARENTHESIS; U+2E5A ⹚ TOP HALF RIGHT PARENTHESIS; U+2E5B ⹛ BOTTOM HALF LEFT PARENTHESIS; U+2E5C ⹜ BOTTOM HALF RIGHT PARENTHESIS; Dingbats: U+2768 ❨ MEDIUM LEFT PARENTHESIS ORNAMENT; U+2769 ❩ MEDIUM RIGHT PARENTHESIS ORNAMENT; U+276A ❪ MEDIUM FLATTENED LEFT PARENTHESIS ORNAMENT; U+276B ❫ MEDIUM FLATTENED RIGHT PARENTHESIS ORNAMENT

The marks ( and ) are parentheses /pəˈrɛnθɪsiːz/ (singular parenthesis /pəˈrɛnθɪsɪs/) in American English, and either round brackets or simply brackets in British English.

In formal writing, "parenthesis" is also used in British English.

=== Uses of ( ) ===
Parentheses contain adjunctive material that serves to clarify (in the manner of a gloss) or is aside from the main point.

A comma before or after the material can also be used, though if the sentence contains commas for other purposes, visual confusion may result. A dash before and after the material is also sometimes used.

Parentheses may be used in formal writing to add supplementary information, such as "Senator John McCain (R – Arizona) spoke at length". They can also indicate shorthand for "either singular or plural" for nouns, e.g. "the claim(s)". It can also be used for gender-neutral language when one gender adds letters to the other, e.g. "(s)he agreed with his/her physician" (the slash is used in his/her because it replaces letters, not just adds them). It can also be used for converting between the imperial and metric system, e.g. "0 °C (32 °F)".

Parenthetical phrases have been used extensively in informal writing and stream of consciousness literature. Examples include the southern American author William Faulkner (see Absalom, Absalom! and the Quentin section of The Sound and the Fury) as well as poet E. E. Cummings.

Parentheses have historically been used where the em dash is currently used in alternatives, such as "parenthesis)(parentheses". Examples of this usage can be seen in editions of Fowler's Dictionary of Modern English Usage.

Parentheses may be nested (generally with one set (such as this) inside another set). This is not commonly used in formal writing (though sometimes other brackets [especially square brackets] will be used for one or more inner sets of parentheses [in other words, secondary {or even tertiary} phrases can be found within the main parenthetical sentence]).

==== Language ====
A parenthesis in rhetoric and linguistics refers to the entire bracketed text, not just to the enclosing marks used (so all the text in this set of round brackets may be described as "a parenthesis"). Taking as an example the sentence "Mrs. Pennyfarthing (What? Yes, that was her name!) was my landlady.", the explanatory phrase between the parentheses is itself called a parenthesis. Again, the parenthesis implies that the meaning and flow of the bracketed phrase is supplemental to the rest of the text and the whole would be unchanged were the parenthesised sentences removed. The term refers to the syntax rather than the enclosure method: the same clause in the form "Mrs. Pennyfarthing – What? Yes, that was her name! – was my landlady" is also a parenthesis. (In non-specialist usage, the term "parenthetical phrase" is more widely understood.)

In phonetics, parentheses are used for indistinguishable or unidentified utterances. They are also seen for silent articulation (mouthing), where the expected phonetic transcription is derived from lip-reading, and with periods to indicate silent pauses, for example (...) or (2 sec).

In some languages, such as the Nicodemus orthography for Coeur d’Alene, parentheses are used as phonemic symbols instead of punctuation.

==== Enumerations ====
An unpaired right parenthesis is often used as part of a label in an ordered list, such as this one:

a) educational testing,
b) technical writing and diagrams,
c) market research, and
d) elections.

==== Accounting ====
Traditionally in accounting, contra amounts are placed in parentheses. A debit balance account in a series of credit balances will have parentheses and vice versa.

==== Parentheses in mathematics ====
Parentheses are used in mathematical notation to indicate grouping, often inducing a different order of operations. For example: in the usual order of algebraic operations, 4 × 3 + 2 equals 14, since the multiplication is done before the addition. However, 4 × (3 + 2) equals 20, because the parentheses override normal precedence, causing the addition to be done first. Some authors follow the convention in mathematical equations that, when parentheses have one level of nesting, the inner pair are parentheses and the outer pair are square brackets. Example:

$[4 \times (3 + 2)]^2 = 400.$

==== Parentheses in programming languages ====
Parentheses are included in the syntaxes of many programming languages. Typically needed to denote an argument; to tell the compiler what data type the method/function needs to look for first in order to initialise. In some cases, such as in LISP, parentheses are a fundamental construct of the language. They are also often used for scoping functions and operators and for arrays. In syntax diagrams they are used for grouping, such as in extended Backus–Naur form.

In Mathematica and the Wolfram language, parentheses are used to indicate grouping – for example, with pure anonymous functions.

==== Taxonomy ====
If it is desired to include the subgenus when giving the scientific name of an animal species or subspecies, the subgenus's name is provided in parentheses between the genus name and the specific epithet. For instance, Polyphylla (Xerasiobia) alba is a way to cite the species Polyphylla alba while also mentioning that it is in the subgenus Xerasiobia. There is also a convention of citing a subgenus by enclosing it in parentheses after its genus, e.g., Polyphylla (Xerasiobia) is a way to refer to the subgenus Xerasiobia within the genus Polyphylla. Parentheses are similarly used to cite a subgenus with the name of a prokaryotic species, although the International Code of Nomenclature of Prokaryotes (ICNP) requires the use of the abbreviation "subgen". as well, e.g., Acetobacter (subgen. Gluconoacetobacter) liquefaciens.

==== Chemistry ====
Parentheses are used in chemistry to denote a repeated substructure within a molecule, e.g. HC(CH_{3})_{3} (isobutane) or, similarly, to indicate the stoichiometry of ionic compounds with such substructures: e.g. Ca(NO_{3})_{2} (calcium nitrate).

This is a notation that was pioneered by Berzelius, who wanted chemical formulae to more resemble algebraic notation, with brackets enclosing groups that could be multiplied (e.g. in 3(AlO_{2} + 2SO_{3}) the 3 multiplies everything within the parentheses).

In chemical nomenclature, parentheses are used to distinguish structural features and multipliers for clarity, for example in the polymer poly(methyl methacrylate).

== Square brackets ==
Square brackets
[ ]

In Unicode
- General purpose (half-width): U+005B [ LEFT SQUARE BRACKET (&lbrack;, &lsqb;); U+005D ] RIGHT SQUARE BRACKET (&rbrack;, &rsqb;); General purpose (full-width East Asian): U+FF3B ［ FULLWIDTH LEFT SQUARE BRACKET; U+FF3D ］ FULLWIDTH RIGHT SQUARE BRACKET; Mediaeval studies: U+2045 ⁅ LEFT SQUARE BRACKET WITH QUILL; U+2046 ⁆ RIGHT SQUARE BRACKET WITH QUILL; Technical/Mathematical: U+23A1 ⎡ LEFT SQUARE BRACKET UPPER CORNER; U+23A2 ⎢ LEFT SQUARE BRACKET EXTENSION; U+23A3 ⎣ LEFT SQUARE BRACKET LOWER CORNER; U+23A4 ⎤ RIGHT SQUARE BRACKET UPPER CORNER; U+23A5 ⎥ RIGHT SQUARE BRACKET EXTENSION; U+23A6 ⎦ RIGHT SQUARE BRACKET LOWER CORNER; U+23B4 ⎴ TOP SQUARE BRACKET (&OverBracket;, &tbrk;); U+23B5 ⎵ BOTTOM SQUARE BRACKET (&bbrk;, &UnderBracket;); U+23B6 ⎶ BOTTOM SQUARE BRACKET OVER TOP SQUARE BRACKET (&bbrktbrk;); U+27E6 ⟦ MATHEMATICAL LEFT WHITE SQUARE BRACKET (&LeftDoubleBracket;, &lobrk;); U+27E7 ⟧ MATHEMATICAL RIGHT WHITE SQUARE BRACKET (&RightDoubleBracket;, &robrk;); U+298B ⦋ LEFT SQUARE BRACKET WITH UNDERBAR (&lbrke;); U+298C ⦌ RIGHT SQUARE BRACKET WITH UNDERBAR (&rbrke;); U+298D ⦍ LEFT SQUARE BRACKET WITH TICK IN TOP CORNER (&lbrkslu;); U+2990 ⦐ RIGHT SQUARE BRACKET WITH TICK IN TOP CORNER (&rbrkslu;); U+298E ⦎ RIGHT SQUARE BRACKET WITH TICK IN BOTTOM CORNER (&rbrksld;); U+298F ⦏ LEFT SQUARE BRACKET WITH TICK IN BOTTOM CORNER (&lbrksld;); Phonetic punctuation: U+2E55 ⹕ LEFT SQUARE BRACKET WITH STROKE; U+2E56 ⹖ RIGHT SQUARE BRACKET WITH STROKE; U+2E57 ⹗ LEFT SQUARE BRACKET WITH DOUBLE STROKE; U+2E58 ⹘ RIGHT SQUARE BRACKET WITH DOUBLE STROKE; Quotation (East Asian texts): U+301A 〚 LEFT WHITE SQUARE BRACKET; U+301B 〛 RIGHT WHITE SQUARE BRACKET

[ and ] are square brackets in both British and American English, but are also more simply brackets in the latter. An older name for these brackets is "crotchets".

=== Uses of [ ] ===
Square brackets are often used to insert explanatory material or to mark where a [word or] passage was omitted from an original material by someone other than the original author, or to mark modifications in quotations. In transcribed interviews, sounds, responses and reactions that are not words but that can be described are set off in square brackets—"... [laughs] ...".

When quoted material is in any way altered, the alterations are enclosed in square brackets within the quotation to show that the quotation is not exactly as given, or to add an annotation. For example: The Plaintiff asserted his cause is just, stating,

[m]y causes is [sic] just.

In the original quoted sentence, the word "my" was capitalised: it has been modified in the quotation given and the change signalled with brackets. Similarly, where the quotation contained a grammatical error (is/are), the quoting author signalled that the error was in the original with "[sic]" (Latin for 'thus').

A square-bracketed ellipsis, [...], is often used to indicate omitted material: "I'd like to thank [several unimportant people] for their tolerance [...]" Bracketed comments inserted into a quote indicate where the original has been modified for clarity: "I appreciate it [the honor], but I must refuse", and "the future of psionics [see definition] is in doubt". Or one can quote the original statement "I hate to do laundry" with a (sometimes grammatical) modification inserted: He "hate[s] to do laundry".

Additionally, a small letter can be replaced by a capital one, when the beginning of the original printed text is being quoted in another piece of text or when the original text has been omitted for succinctness— for example, when referring to a verbose original: "To the extent that policymakers and elite opinion in general have made use of economic analysis at all, they have, as the saying goes, done so the way a drunkard uses a lamppost: for support, not illumination", can be quoted succinctly as: "[P]olicymakers [...] have made use of economic analysis [...] the way a drunkard uses a lamppost: for support, not illumination." When nested parentheses are needed, brackets are sometimes used as a substitute for the inner pair of parentheses within the outer pair. When deeper levels of nesting are needed, convention is to alternate between parentheses and brackets at each level.

Alternatively, empty square brackets can also indicate omitted material, usually single letter only. The original, "Reading is also a process and it also changes you." can be rewritten in a quote as: It has been suggested that reading can "also change[] you".

In translated works, brackets are used to signify the same word or phrase in the original language to avoid ambiguity. For example: He is trained in the way of the open hand [karate].

Style and usage guides originating in the news industry of the twentieth century, such as the AP Stylebook, recommend against the use of square brackets because "They cannot be transmitted over news wires." However, this guidance has little relevance outside of the technological constraints of the industry and era.

In linguistics, phonetic transcriptions are generally enclosed within square brackets, whereas phonemic transcriptions typically use paired slashes, according to International Phonetic Alphabet rules. Pipes (| |) are often used to indicate a morphophonemic rather than phonemic representation. Other conventions are double slashes (⫽ ⫽), double pipes (‖ ‖) and curly brackets ({ }).

In lexicography, square brackets usually surround the section of a dictionary entry which contains the etymology of the word the entry defines.

==== Proofreading ====
Brackets (called move-left symbols or move right symbols) are added to the sides of text in proofreading to indicate changes in indentation:

Move left	[To Fate I sue, of other means bereft, the only refuge for the wretched left.
Centre	]Paradise Lost[
Move up	

Square brackets are used to denote parts of the text that need to be checked when preparing drafts prior to finalising a document.

==== Law ====
Square brackets are used in some countries in the citation of law reports to identify parallel citations to non-official reporters. For example:

Chronicle Pub. Co. v Superior Court (1998) 54 Cal.2d 548, [7 Cal.Rptr. 109]

In some other countries (such as England and Wales), square brackets are used to indicate that the year is part of the citation and parentheses are used to indicate the year the judgment was given. For example:

National Coal Board v England [1954] AC 403

This case is in the 1954 volume of the Appeal Cases reports, although the decision may have been given in 1953 or earlier. Compare with:

(1954) 98 Sol Jo 176

This citation reports a decision from 1954, in volume 98 of the Solicitors Journal which may have been published in 1955 or later.

They often denote points that have not yet been agreed to in legal drafts and the year in which a report was made for certain case law decisions.

==== Square brackets in mathematics ====
Brackets are used in mathematics in a variety of notations, including standard notations for commutators, the floor function, the Lie bracket, equivalence classes, the Iverson bracket, and matrices.

Square brackets may be used exclusively or in combination with parentheses to represent intervals as interval notation. For example, [0,5] represents the set of real numbers from 0 to 5 inclusive. Both parentheses and brackets are used to denote a half-open interval; [5, 12) would be the set of all real numbers between 5 and 12, including 5 but not 12. The numbers may come as close as they like to 12, including 11.999 and so forth, but 12.0 is not included. In some European countries, the notation [5, 12[ is also used. The endpoint adjoining the square bracket is known as closed, whereas the endpoint adjoining the parenthesis is known as open.

In group theory and ring theory, brackets denote the commutator. In group theory, the commutator [g, h] is commonly defined as g^{−1} h^{−1} g h . In ring theory, the commutator [a, b] is defined as a b − b a .

==== Chemistry ====
Square brackets can also be used in chemistry to represent the concentration of a chemical substance in solution and to denote charge a Lewis structure of an ion (particularly distributed charge in a complex ion), repeating chemical units (particularly in polymers) and transition state structures, among other uses.

==== Square brackets in programming languages ====
Brackets are used in many computer programming languages, primarily for array indexing. But they are also used to denote general tuples, sets and other structures, just as in mathematics. There may be several other uses as well, depending on the language at hand. In syntax diagrams they are used for optional portions, such as in extended Backus–Naur form.

=== Double brackets ⟦ ⟧ ===
Double brackets (or white square brackets or Scott brackets (named after Dana Scott)), ⟦ ⟧, are used to indicate the semantic valuation function in formal semantics for natural language and denotational semantics for programming languages. In the Wolfram Language, double brackets, either as iterated single brackets ([[) or ligatures (〚) are used for list indexing.

The brackets stand for a function that maps a linguistic expression to its "denotation" or semantic value. In mathematics, double brackets may also be used to denote intervals of integers or, less often, the floor function. In papyrology, following the Leiden Conventions, they are used to enclose text that has been deleted in antiquity.

=== Lenticular brackets【】 ===
Some East Asian languages use lenticular brackets 【 】, a combination of square brackets and round brackets. In Chinese, they are called 方頭括號 (fāngtóu kuòhào) and in Japanese, 隅付き括弧 (sumitsuki kakko). They are used in titles and headings in both Chinese and Japanese. On the Internet, they are used to emphasise a text. In Japanese, they are most frequently seen in dictionaries for quoting Chinese characters and Sino-Japanese loanwords.

=== Floor ⌊ ⌋ and ceiling ⌈ ⌉ corner brackets ===
Floor and ceiling
⌊floor⌋	⌈ceiling⌉

In Unicode
- Ceilings and floors: U+2308 ⌈ LEFT CEILING (&lceil;, &LeftCeiling;); U+2309 ⌉ RIGHT CEILING (&rceil;, &RightCeiling;); U+230A ⌊ LEFT FLOOR (&LeftFloor;, &lfloor;); U+230B ⌋ RIGHT FLOOR (&rfloor;, &RightFloor;)

The floor corner brackets ⌊ ⌋ and ceiling corner brackets ⌈ ⌉ are used to denote the integer floor and ceiling functions in mathematics.

=== Quine corners ⌜⌝ and half brackets ⸤ ⸥ or ⸢ ⸣ ===
The Quine corners ⌜ and ⌝ have at least two uses in mathematical logic: either as quasi-quotation, a generalisation of quotation marks, or to denote the Gödel number of the enclosed expression.

Half brackets are used in English to mark added text, such as in translations: "Bill saw ⸤her⸥".

In editions of papyrological texts, half brackets, ⸤ and ⸥ or ⸢ and ⸣, enclose text which is lacking in the papyrus due to damage, but can be restored by virtue of another source, such as an ancient quotation of the text transmitted by the papyrus. For example, Callimachus Iambus 1.2 reads: "ἐκ τῶν ὅκου βοῦν κολλύ⸤βου π⸥ιπρήσκουσιν". A hole in the papyrus has obliterated "βου π", but these letters are supplied by an ancient commentary on the poem. Second intermittent sources can be between ⸢ and ⸣. Quine corners are sometimes used instead of half brackets.

In scholarly texts dealing with assyriological or other cuneiform languages, the half brackets ⸢ and ⸣ often enclose not material restored from other texts, but partially broken signs that are still somewhat legible.

=== Brackets with quills ⁅ ⁆ ===
Known as "spike parentheses" (Swedish: piggparenteser), ⁅ and ⁆ are used in Swedish bilingual dictionaries to enclose supplemental constructions.

== Curly brackets ==
Curly brackets
{ }

In Unicode
- General (half width): U+007B { LEFT CURLY BRACKET (&lbrace;, &lcub;); U+007D } RIGHT CURLY BRACKET (&rbrace;, &rcub;); General (full-width East Asian): U+FF5B ｛ FULLWIDTH LEFT CURLY BRACKET; U+FF5D ｝ FULLWIDTH RIGHT CURLY BRACKET; Technical/Mathematical (half-width): U+23A7 ⎧ LEFT CURLY BRACKET UPPER HOOK; U+23A8 ⎨ LEFT CURLY BRACKET MIDDLE PIECE; U+23A9 ⎩ LEFT CURLY BRACKET LOWER HOOK; U+23AB ⎫ RIGHT CURLY BRACKET UPPER HOOK; U+23AC ⎬ RIGHT CURLY BRACKET MIDDLE PIECE; U+23AD ⎭ RIGHT CURLY BRACKET LOWER HOOK; U+23AA ⎪ CURLY BRACKET EXTENSION; U+23B0 ⎰ UPPER LEFT OR LOWER RIGHT CURLY BRACKET SECTION (&lmoust;, &lmoustache;); U+23B1 ⎱ UPPER RIGHT OR LOWER LEFT CURLY BRACKET SECTION (&rmoust;, &rmoustache;); U+23DE ⏞ TOP CURLY BRACKET (&OverBrace;); U+23DF ⏟ BOTTOM CURLY BRACKET (&UnderBrace;); Dingbats: U+2774 ❴ MEDIUM LEFT CURLY BRACKET ORNAMENT; U+2775 ❵ MEDIUM RIGHT CURLY BRACKET ORNAMENT

{ and } are curly brackets or curly braces in both American and British English.

=== Uses of { } ===
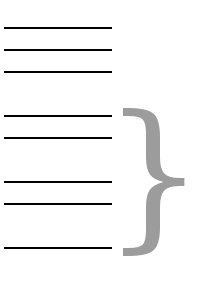
An example of curly brackets used to group sentences together

Curly brackets are used by text editors to mark editorial insertions or interpolations, or constitute the anchors of text annotations; for each of which when indicating a relationship between otherwise separate elements, the resulting variant may be qualified as "large".

Braces used to be used to connect multiple lines of poetry, such as triplets in a poem of rhyming couplets, although this usage had gone out of fashion by the 19th century.

Another older use in prose was to eliminate duplication in lists and tables. Two examples here from Charles Hutton's 19th century table of weights and measures in his A Course of Mathematics:

In this kingdom
The standard of ...

⎧ ⎪ ⎨ ⎪ ⎩

Length is a Yard.
Surface is a Square Yard, the 1/4840 of an Acre.
⎰ Solidity is a Cubic Yard.
⎱ Capacity is a Gallon.
Weight is a Pound.

Imperial measure of CAPACITY for coals, culm, lime, fish, potatoes, fruit,– and other goods commonly sold by heaped measure:
2 Gallons	= 1 Peck	= 764	⎱	Cubic Inches, nearly
8 Gallons	= 1 Bushel	= 2813 1/2	⎰	Cubic Inches, nearly
3 Bushels	= 1 Sack	= 4 8/9	⎱	Cubic Feet, nearly
12 Sacks	= 1 Chald.	= 58 2/3	⎰	Cubic Feet, nearly

As an extension to the International Phonetic Alphabet (IPA), braces are used for prosodic notation.

==== Music ====
In music, they are known as "accolades" or "braces", and connect two or more lines (staves) of music that are played simultaneously.

==== Chemistry ====
The use of braces in chemistry is an old notation that has long since been superseded by subscripted numbers. The chemical formula for water, H_{2}O, was represented as $\left . \ce{{H}\atop{H}} \right \} \ce{O}$.

==== Curly brackets in programming languages ====
In many programming languages, curly brackets enclose groups of statements and create a local scope. Such languages (C, C#, C++ and many others) are therefore called curly bracket languages. They are also used to define structures and enumerated type in these languages.

In various Unix shells, they enclose a group of strings that are used in a process known as brace expansion, where each successive string in the group is interpolated at that point in the command line to generate the command-line's final form. The mechanism originated in the C shell and the string generation mechanism is a simple interpolation that can occur anywhere in a command line and takes no account of existing filenames.

In syntax diagrams they are used for repetition, such as in extended Backus–Naur form.

In the Z formal specification language, braces define a set.

==== Curly brackets in mathematics ====
In mathematics they delimit sets, in what is called set notation. Braces enclose either a literal list of set elements, or a rule that defines the set elements. For example:

- S = {a, b} defines a set S containing a and b.
- S = {x | x > 0} defines a set S of all positive real numbers. The vertical bar (|) means "such that", and the condition x > 0 specifies which real numbers belong to the set.

They are often also used to denote the Poisson bracket between two quantities.

In ring theory, braces denote the anticommutator where {a, b} is defined as a b + b a .

== Angle brackets ==
Angle brackets
⟨ ⟩	⟪ ⟫	< >
Angle brackets (BE&AE)	Angle brackets (BE&AE)	less-than and greater-than

In Unicode
- Less/greater than (half width): U+003C < LESS-THAN SIGN (&lt;, &LT;); U+003E > GREATER-THAN SIGN (&gt;, &GT;); Less/greater than (full-width East Asian): U+FF1C ＜ FULLWIDTH LESS-THAN SIGN; U+FF1E ＞ FULLWIDTH GREATER-THAN SIGN; Technical/Mathematical (half-width): U+2329 〈 LEFT-POINTING ANGLE BRACKET (Note: &lang; and &rang; were tied to the deprecated symbols U+2329 and U+232A in HTML4 and MathML2, but are being migrated to U+27E8 and U+27E9 for HTML5 and MathML3, as defined in XML Entity Definitions for Characters (Archived 27 January 2013 at the Wayback Machine).); U+232A 〉 RIGHT-POINTING ANGLE BRACKET; U+27E8 ⟨ MATHEMATICAL LEFT ANGLE BRACKET (&lang;, &langle;, &LeftAngleBracket;); U+27E9 ⟩ MATHEMATICAL RIGHT ANGLE BRACKET (&rang;, &rangle;, &RightAngleBracket;); U+27EA ⟪ MATHEMATICAL LEFT DOUBLE ANGLE BRACKET (&Lang;); U+27EB ⟫ MATHEMATICAL RIGHT DOUBLE ANGLE BRACKET (&Rang;); U+2991 ⦑ LEFT ANGLE BRACKET WITH DOT (&langd;); U+2992 ⦒ RIGHT ANGLE BRACKET WITH DOT (&rangd;); U+29FC ⧼ LEFT-POINTING CURVED ANGLE BRACKET; U+29FD ⧽ RIGHT-POINTING CURVED ANGLE BRACKET; Quotation (fullwidth East-Asian texts): U+3008 〈 LEFT ANGLE BRACKET; U+3009 〉 RIGHT ANGLE BRACKET; U+300A 《 LEFT DOUBLE ANGLE BRACKET; U+300B 》 RIGHT DOUBLE ANGLE BRACKET; Dingbats: U+276C ❬ MEDIUM LEFT-POINTING ANGLE BRACKET ORNAMENT; U+276D ❭ MEDIUM RIGHT-POINTING ANGLE BRACKET ORNAMENT; U+2770 ❰ HEAVY LEFT-POINTING ANGLE BRACKET ORNAMENT; U+2771 ❱ HEAVY RIGHT-POINTING ANGLE BRACKET ORNAMENT; U+276E ❮ HEAVY LEFT-POINTING ANGLE QUOTATION MARK ORNAMENT; U+276F ❯ HEAVY RIGHT-POINTING ANGLE QUOTATION MARK ORNAMENT

The symbols ⟨ and ⟩ are angle brackets in both American and British English. In (largely archaic) computer slang, they were sometimes known as "brokets". They are also sometimes called chevrons, but chevrons normally only point upwards or downwards.

The ASCII characters less-than sign and greater-than sign < and > are widely substituted for angle brackets. In many cases, only these substituted characters are accepted by computer programs, and the Unicode angle brackets are not recognised (for instance, in HTML tags). The characters for "single" guillemets (European-style single quotation marks, ‹ and ›) are also occasionally used to indicate angle brackets, and normal guillemets (European-style double quotation marks, « and ») used when "nested" (ie, double) angle brackets are needed.

The angle brackets U+27E8 ⟨ MATHEMATICAL LEFT ANGLE BRACKET and U+27E9 ⟩ MATHEMATICAL RIGHT ANGLE BRACKET are for mathematical use and Western languages, whereas U+3008 〈 LEFT ANGLE BRACKET and U+3009 〉 RIGHT ANGLE BRACKET are double width forms for East Asian languages. The angle bracket symbols at U+2329 and U+232A are deprecated in favour of the U+3008 and U+3009 East Asian angle brackets. Unicode discourages their use for mathematics and in Western texts, because they are canonically equivalent to the CJK code points U+300n and thus likely to render as double-width symbols.

=== Shape ===
Angle brackets are larger than 'less-than' and 'greater-than' signs, which in turn are larger than guillemets.

Angle brackets, less-than/greater-than signs and single guillemets in fonts Cambria, DejaVu Serif, Andron Mega Corpus, Andika and Everson Mono

=== Uses of ⟨ ⟩ ===
Angle brackets are infrequently used to denote words that are thought instead of spoken, such as:

⟨What an unusual flower!⟩

In textual criticism, and hence in many editions of pre-modern works, chevrons denote sections of the text which are illegible or otherwise lost; the editor will often insert their own reconstruction where possible within them.

In linguistics, angle brackets identify graphemes (e.g., letters of an alphabet) or orthography, as in "The English word /kæt/ is spelled ⟨cat⟩."

In epigraphy, they may be used for mechanical transliterations of a text into the Latin script.

In East Asian punctuation, angle brackets are used as quotation marks. Angle bracket symbols are part of standard Chinese, Japanese, Korean punctuation, where they generally enclose the titles of books, as: 〈 ︙ 〉 or 《 ︙ 》 for traditional vertical printing — written in vertical lines — and as 〈 ... 〉 or 《 ... 》 for horizontal printing — in horizontal.

==== Angle brackets in mathematics ====
Angle brackets (or 'chevrons') are used in group theory to write group presentations, and to denote the subgroup generated by a collection of elements. In set theory, chevrons or parentheses are used to denote ordered pairs and other tuples, whereas curly brackets are used for unordered sets.

==== Physics and mechanics ====
In physical sciences and statistical mechanics, angle brackets are used to denote an average (expected value) over a set of data (ensemble average) or over time or another continuous parameter (time or space average). For example:

$$\left\langle V(t)^2 \right\rangle = \lim_{T\to\infty} \frac{1}{T}\int_{-\frac{T}{2}}^{\frac{T}{2}} V(t)^2\,{\rm{d}}t.$$

In mathematical physics, especially quantum mechanics, it is common to write the inner product between elements as ⟨a|b⟩, as a short version of ⟨a|·|b⟩, or ⟨a|Ô|b⟩, where Ô is an operator. This is known as Dirac notation or bra–ket notation, to note vectors from the dual spaces of the Bra ⟨A| and the Ket |B⟩. But there are other notations used.

In continuum mechanics, chevrons may be used as Macaulay brackets.

==== Angle brackets in programming languages ====
In C++ angle brackets (actually less-than and greater-than symbols) are used to surround arguments to templates. They are also used to surround the names of header files; this usage was inherited from and is also found in C.

In Z, a formal specification language, angle brackets define a sequence.

In HTML, angle brackets (actually less-than and greater-than symbols) are used to bracket meta text. For example <b> denotes that the following text should be displayed as bold. Pairs of meta text tags are required – much as brackets themselves are usually in pairs. The end of the bold text segment would be indicated by </b>. This use is sometimes extended as an informal mechanism for communicating mood or tone in digital formats such as messaging, for example adding "<sighs>" at the end of a sentence.

== Unicode ==
Representations of various kinds of brackets in Unicode and their respective HTML entities, that are not in the infoboxes in preceding sections, are given below.

Unicode and HTML encodings for various bracket characters
Uses	Unicode/HTML	Sample
Quine corners	U+231C ⌜ TOP LEFT CORNER (&ulcorn;, &ulcorner;)	⌜quasi-quotation⌝ ⌜editorial notation⌝
Quine corners	U+231D ⌝ TOP RIGHT CORNER (&urcorn;, &urcorner;)	⌜quasi-quotation⌝ ⌜editorial notation⌝
Quine corners	U+231E ⌞ BOTTOM LEFT CORNER (&dlcorn;, &llcorner;)	⌞editorial notation⌟
Quine corners	U+231F ⌟ BOTTOM RIGHT CORNER (&drcorn;, &lrcorner;)	⌞editorial notation⌟
Brackets with quill	U+2046 ⁆ RIGHT SQUARE BRACKET WITH QUILL	⁅...⁆
Brackets with quill	U+2045 ⁅ LEFT SQUARE BRACKET WITH QUILL	⁅...⁆
Fullwidth parentheses	U+FF5F ｟ FULLWIDTH LEFT WHITE PARENTHESIS	｟...｠
Fullwidth parentheses	U+FF60 ｠ FULLWIDTH RIGHT WHITE PARENTHESIS	｟...｠
Technical/mathematical (specialised)	U+23B8 ⎸ LEFT VERTICAL BOX LINE	⎸boxed text⎹
Technical/mathematical (specialised)	U+23B9 ⎹ RIGHT VERTICAL BOX LINE	⎸boxed text⎹
Technical/mathematical (specialised)	U+23E0 ⏠ TOP TORTOISE SHELL BRACKET	⏠ tortoise shell brackets ⏡
Technical/mathematical (specialised)	U+23E1 ⏡ BOTTOM TORTOISE SHELL BRACKET	⏠ tortoise shell brackets ⏡
Technical/mathematical (specialised)	U+27C5 ⟅ LEFT S-SHAPED BAG DELIMITER	⟅...⟆
Technical/mathematical (specialised)	U+27C6 ⟆ RIGHT S-SHAPED BAG DELIMITER	⟅...⟆
Technical/mathematical (specialised)	U+27D3 ⟓ LOWER RIGHT CORNER WITH DOT	⟓pullback...pushout⟔
Technical/mathematical (specialised)	U+27D4 ⟔ UPPER LEFT CORNER WITH DOT	⟓pullback...pushout⟔
Technical/mathematical (specialised)	U+27E6 ⟦ MATHEMATICAL LEFT WHITE SQUARE BRACKET	⟦...⟧
Technical/mathematical (specialised)	U+27E7 ⟧ MATHEMATICAL RIGHT WHITE SQUARE BRACKET	⟦...⟧
Technical/mathematical (specialised)	U+27EC ⟬ MATHEMATICAL LEFT WHITE TORTOISE SHELL BRACKET (&loang;)	⟬white tortoise shell brackets⟭
Technical/mathematical (specialised)	U+27ED ⟭ MATHEMATICAL RIGHT WHITE TORTOISE SHELL BRACKET (&roang;)	⟬white tortoise shell brackets⟭
Technical/mathematical (specialised)	U+2987 ⦇ Z NOTATION LEFT IMAGE BRACKET	R⦇S⦈
Technical/mathematical (specialised)	U+2988 ⦈ Z NOTATION RIGHT IMAGE BRACKET	R⦇S⦈
Technical/mathematical (specialised)	U+2989 ⦉ Z NOTATION LEFT BINDING BRACKET	⦉x:Z⦊
Technical/mathematical (specialised)	U+298A ⦊ Z NOTATION RIGHT BINDING BRACKET	⦉x:Z⦊
Technical/mathematical (specialised)	U+2993 ⦓ LEFT ARC LESS-THAN BRACKET (&lparlt;)	⦓inequality sign brackets⦔
Technical/mathematical (specialised)	U+2994 ⦔ RIGHT ARC GREATER-THAN BRACKET (&rpargt;)	⦓inequality sign brackets⦔
Technical/mathematical (specialised)	U+2995 ⦕ DOUBLE LEFT ARC GREATER-THAN BRACKET (&gtlPar;)	⦕inequality sign brackets⦖
Technical/mathematical (specialised)	U+2996 ⦖ DOUBLE RIGHT ARC LESS-THAN BRACKET (&ltrPar;)	⦕inequality sign brackets⦖
Technical/mathematical (specialised)	U+2997 ⦗ LEFT BLACK TORTOISE SHELL BRACKET	⦗black tortoise shell brackets⦘
Technical/mathematical (specialised)	U+2998 ⦘ RIGHT BLACK TORTOISE SHELL BRACKET	⦗black tortoise shell brackets⦘
Technical/mathematical (specialised)	U+29D8 ⧘ LEFT WIGGLY FENCE	⧘...⧙
Technical/mathematical (specialised)	U+29D9 ⧙ RIGHT WIGGLY FENCE	⧘...⧙
Technical/mathematical (specialised)	U+29DA ⧚ LEFT DOUBLE WIGGLY FENCE	⧚...⧛
Technical/mathematical (specialised)	U+29DB ⧛ RIGHT DOUBLE WIGGLY FENCE	⧚...⧛
Technical/mathematical (specialised)	U+301A 〚 LEFT WHITE SQUARE BRACKET	〚...〛
Technical/mathematical (specialised)	U+301B 〛 RIGHT WHITE SQUARE BRACKET	〚...〛
Half brackets	U+2E22 ⸢ TOP LEFT HALF BRACKET	⸢editorial notation⸣
Half brackets	U+2E23 ⸣ TOP RIGHT HALF BRACKET	⸢editorial notation⸣
Half brackets	U+2E24 ⸤ BOTTOM LEFT HALF BRACKET	⸤editorial notation⸥
Half brackets	U+2E25 ⸥ BOTTOM RIGHT HALF BRACKET	⸤editorial notation⸥
Compatibility variants for CNS 11643	U+FE59 ﹙ SMALL LEFT PARENTHESIS	﹙...﹚
Compatibility variants for CNS 11643	U+FE5A ﹚ SMALL RIGHT PARENTHESIS	﹙...﹚
Compatibility variants for CNS 11643	U+FE5B ﹛ SMALL LEFT CURLY BRACKET	﹛...﹜
Compatibility variants for CNS 11643	U+FE5C ﹜ SMALL RIGHT CURLY BRACKET	﹛...﹜
Compatibility variants for CNS 11643	U+FE5D ﹝ SMALL LEFT TORTOISE SHELL BRACKET	﹝...﹞
Compatibility variants for CNS 11643	U+FE5E ﹞ SMALL RIGHT TORTOISE SHELL BRACKET	﹝...﹞
Dingbats	U+2772 ❲ LIGHT LEFT TORTOISE SHELL BRACKET ORNAMENT (&lbbrk;)	❲light tortoise shell bracket ornament❳
Dingbats	U+2773 ❳ LIGHT RIGHT TORTOISE SHELL BRACKET ORNAMENT (&rbbrk;)	❲light tortoise shell bracket ornament❳
N'Ko	U+2E1C ⸜ LEFT LOW PARAPHRASE BRACKET	⸜ߒߞߏ⸝
N'Ko	U+2E1D ⸝ RIGHT LOW PARAPHRASE BRACKET	⸜ߒߞߏ⸝
Ogham	U+169B ᚛ OGHAM FEATHER MARK	᚛ᚑᚌᚐᚋ᚜
Ogham	U+169C ᚜ OGHAM REVERSED FEATHER MARK	᚛ᚑᚌᚐᚋ᚜
Old Hungarian	U+2E42 ⹂ DOUBLE LOW-REVERSED-9 QUOTATION MARK	⹂
Tibetan	U+0F3A ༺ TIBETAN MARK GUG RTAGS GYON	༺དབུ་ཅན་༻
Tibetan	U+0F3B ༻ TIBETAN MARK GUG RTAGS GYAS	༺དབུ་ཅན་༻
Tibetan	U+0F3C ༼ TIBETAN MARK ANG KHANG GYON	༼༡༢༣༽
Tibetan	U+0F3D ༽ TIBETAN MARK ANG KHANG GYAS	༼༡༢༣༽
New Testament editorial marks	U+2E02 ⸂ LEFT SUBSTITUTION BRACKET	⸂...⸃
New Testament editorial marks	U+2E03 ⸃ RIGHT SUBSTITUTION BRACKET	⸂...⸃
New Testament editorial marks	U+2E04 ⸄ LEFT DOTTED SUBSTITUTION BRACKET	⸄...⸅
New Testament editorial marks	U+2E05 ⸅ RIGHT DOTTED SUBSTITUTION BRACKET	⸄...⸅
New Testament editorial marks	U+2E09 ⸉ LEFT TRANSPOSITION BRACKET	⸉...⸊
New Testament editorial marks	U+2E0A ⸊ RIGHT TRANSPOSITION BRACKET	⸉...⸊
New Testament editorial marks	U+2E0C ⸌ LEFT RAISED OMISSION BRACKET	⸌...⸍
New Testament editorial marks	U+2E0D ⸍ RIGHT RAISED OMISSION BRACKET	⸌...⸍
Medieval studies	U+2E26 ⸦ LEFT SIDEWAYS U BRACKET	⸦crux⸧
Medieval studies	U+2E27 ⸧ RIGHT SIDEWAYS U BRACKET	⸦crux⸧
Indicate ellipsis in certain conventions for Japanese transliteration	U+2E55 ⹕ LEFT SQUARE BRACKET WITH STROKE	⹕optional ellipsis⹖
Indicate ellipsis in certain conventions for Japanese transliteration	U+2E56 ⹖ RIGHT SQUARE BRACKET WITH STROKE	⹕optional ellipsis⹖
Indicate ellipsis in certain conventions for Japanese transliteration	U+2E57 ⹗ LEFT SQUARE BRACKET WITH DOUBLE STROKE	⹗obligatory ellipsis⹘
Indicate ellipsis in certain conventions for Japanese transliteration	U+2E58 ⹘ RIGHT SQUARE BRACKET WITH DOUBLE STROKE	⹗obligatory ellipsis⹘
English Phonotypic Alphabet	U+2E62 ⹢ LEFT PARENTHESIS WITH MIDDLE RING	⹢...⹣
English Phonotypic Alphabet	U+2E63 ⹣ RIGHT PARENTHESIS WITH MIDDLE RING	⹢...⹣
Quotation (East-Asian texts)	U+3014 〔 LEFT TORTOISE SHELL BRACKET	〔...〕
Quotation (East-Asian texts)	U+3015 〕 RIGHT TORTOISE SHELL BRACKET	〔...〕
Quotation (East-Asian texts)	U+3016 〖 LEFT WHITE LENTICULAR BRACKET	〖...〗
Quotation (East-Asian texts)	U+3017 〗 RIGHT WHITE LENTICULAR BRACKET	〖...〗
Quotation (East-Asian texts)	U+3018 〘 LEFT WHITE TORTOISE SHELL BRACKET	〘...〙
Quotation (East-Asian texts)	U+3019 〙 RIGHT WHITE TORTOISE SHELL BRACKET	〘...〙
Quotation (East-Asian texts)	U+301D 〝 REVERSED DOUBLE PRIME QUOTATION MARK	〝...〞
Quotation (East-Asian texts)	U+301E 〞 DOUBLE PRIME QUOTATION MARK (Note: This is fullwidth version of U+2033 ″ DOUBLE PRIME. In vertical texts, U+301F 〟 LOW DOUBLE PRIME QUOTATION MARK is preferred.)	〝...〞
Quotation (halfwidth East-Asian texts)	U+FF62 ｢ HALFWIDTH LEFT CORNER BRACKET	｢ｶﾀｶﾅ｣
Quotation (halfwidth East-Asian texts)	U+FF63 ｣ HALFWIDTH RIGHT CORNER BRACKET	｢ｶﾀｶﾅ｣
Quotation (fullwidth East-Asian texts)	U+300C 「 LEFT CORNER BRACKET	「表題」
Quotation (fullwidth East-Asian texts)	U+300D 」 RIGHT CORNER BRACKET	「表題」
Quotation (fullwidth East-Asian texts)	U+300E 『 LEFT WHITE CORNER BRACKET	『表題』
Quotation (fullwidth East-Asian texts)	U+300F 』 RIGHT WHITE CORNER BRACKET	『表題』
Quotation (fullwidth East-Asian texts)	U+3010 【 LEFT BLACK LENTICULAR BRACKET	【表題】
Quotation (fullwidth East-Asian texts)	U+3011 】 RIGHT BLACK LENTICULAR BRACKET	【表題】
Vertical bracket presentation forms (Note: These characters are not used in typical documents. Instead the respective horizontal characters are used and the character that is rendered depends on the writing direction.)	U+FE17 ︗ PRESENTATION FORM FOR VERTICAL LEFT WHITE LENTICULAR BRACKET	︗︙︙︘
Vertical bracket presentation forms	U+FE18 ︘ PRESENTATION FORM FOR VERTICAL RIGHT WHITE LENTICULAR BRACKET (Note: The original name of this character is "Presentation Form For Vertical Right White Lenticular Brakcet [sic]". Since Unicode character names cannot be changed, this character has the corrected name as an alias.)	︗︙︙︘
Vertical bracket presentation forms	U+FE35 ︵ PRESENTATION FORM FOR VERTICAL LEFT PARENTHESIS	︵︙︙︶
Vertical bracket presentation forms	U+FE36 ︶ PRESENTATION FORM FOR VERTICAL RIGHT PARENTHESIS	︵︙︙︶
Vertical bracket presentation forms	U+FE37 ︷ PRESENTATION FORM FOR VERTICAL LEFT CURLY BRACKET	︷︙︙︸
Vertical bracket presentation forms	U+FE38 ︸ PRESENTATION FORM FOR VERTICAL RIGHT CURLY BRACKET	︷︙︙︸
Vertical bracket presentation forms	U+FE39 ︹ PRESENTATION FORM FOR VERTICAL LEFT TORTOISE SHELL BRACKET	︹︙︙︺
Vertical bracket presentation forms	U+FE3A ︺ PRESENTATION FORM FOR VERTICAL RIGHT TORTOISE SHELL BRACKET	︹︙︙︺
Vertical bracket presentation forms	U+FE3B ︻ PRESENTATION FORM FOR VERTICAL LEFT BLACK LENTICULAR BRACKET	︻︙︙︼
Vertical bracket presentation forms	U+FE3C ︼ PRESENTATION FORM FOR VERTICAL RIGHT BLACK LENTICULAR BRACKET	︻︙︙︼
Vertical bracket presentation forms	U+FE3D ︽ PRESENTATION FORM FOR VERTICAL LEFT DOUBLE ANGLE BRACKET	︽︙︙︾
Vertical bracket presentation forms	U+FE3E ︾ PRESENTATION FORM FOR VERTICAL RIGHT DOUBLE ANGLE BRACKET	︽︙︙︾
Vertical bracket presentation forms	U+FE3F ︿ PRESENTATION FORM FOR VERTICAL LEFT ANGLE BRACKET	︿︙︙﹀
Vertical bracket presentation forms	U+FE40 ﹀ PRESENTATION FORM FOR VERTICAL RIGHT ANGLE BRACKET	︿︙︙﹀
Vertical bracket presentation forms	U+FE41 ﹁ PRESENTATION FORM FOR VERTICAL LEFT CORNER BRACKET	﹁︙︙﹂
Vertical bracket presentation forms	U+FE42 ﹂ PRESENTATION FORM FOR VERTICAL RIGHT CORNER BRACKET	﹁︙︙﹂
Vertical bracket presentation forms	U+FE43 ﹃ PRESENTATION FORM FOR VERTICAL LEFT WHITE CORNER BRACKET	﹃︙︙﹄
Vertical bracket presentation forms	U+FE44 ﹄ PRESENTATION FORM FOR VERTICAL RIGHT WHITE CORNER BRACKET	﹃︙︙﹄
Vertical bracket presentation forms	U+FE47 ﹇ PRESENTATION FORM FOR VERTICAL LEFT SQUARE BRACKET	﹇︙︙﹈
Vertical bracket presentation forms	U+FE48 ﹈ PRESENTATION FORM FOR VERTICAL RIGHT SQUARE BRACKET	﹇︙︙﹈

== See also ==
- Bracket (mathematics)
- International variation in quotation marks
- Emoticon
- Japanese typographic symbols
- Order of operations
- Triple parentheses
