= Event =

Event or the event may refer to:

== Arts and entertainment ==
=== Film and television ===
- Event film, a term used to describe highly anticipated blockbusters
- The Event, an American conspiracy thriller television series for NBC
- The Event (2003 film), directed by Thom Fitzgerald
- The Event (2015 film), directed by Sergei Loznitsa
- The Event (Iranian TV program), presented by Reza Rashidpour
- Derren Brown: The Events, a Channel 4 television series
- The Event, a 2012 British short film directed by Julia Pott

=== Literature ===
- Event, a literary magazine published by Douglas College

== Businesses ==
- Event Communications, a London-based museum design consultancy
- The Event Group, a Canadian strategic event management firm

== Gatherings of people ==
- Ceremony, an event of ritual significance, performed on a special occasion
- Convention (meeting), a gathering of individuals engaged in some common interest
- Event management, the organization of events
- Festival, an event that celebrates some unique aspect of a community
- Happening, a type of artistic performance
- Media event, an event created for publicity
- Party, a social, recreational or corporate events held
- Sporting event, at which athletic competition takes place
- Virtual event, a gathering of individuals within a virtual environment

== Science, technology, and mathematics ==
- Event (computing), a software message indicating that something has happened, such as a keystroke or mouse click
- Event (philosophy), an object in time, or an instantiation of a property in an object
- Event (probability theory), a set of outcomes to which a probability is assigned
- Event (relativity), a point in space at an instant in time, i.e. a location in spacetime
- Event (synchronization primitive), a type of synchronization mechanism
- Event (UML), in Unified Modeling Language, a notable occurrence at a particular point in time
- Event (particle physics), refers to the results just after a fundamental interaction took place between subatomic particles
- Event horizon, a boundary in spacetime, typically surrounding a black hole, beyond which events cannot affect an exterior observer
- Extinction event, a sharp decrease in the number of extant species in a short period of time
- Impact event, in which an extraterrestrial object impacts planet
- Mental event, something that happens in the mind, such as a thought

== Transportation ==
- Event (yacht), a 62.40 metres (205 ft) yacht built by Amels Holland B.V.

== See also ==
- Accident, an accident is an unintended, normally unwanted event that was not directly caused by humans.
- Competition, a contest between organisms, animals, individuals, groups, etc.
- Disaster, an event causing significant damage or destruction, loss of life, or change to the environment
- Event chain methodology, in project management
- Eventing, an equestrian event comprising dressage, cross-country and show-jumping
- Eventive (disambiguation)
- Grouped events, in philosophy, the experience of two or more events that occur in sequence or concurrently that can be subsequently categorized
- News, new information or information on current events
- Phenomenon, any observable occurrence
- Portal:Current events, (Wikipedia portal)
- Sequence of events
- Sustainable event management or event greening
