= Wirth syntax notation =

Formal way to describe formal languages

Wirth syntax notation (WSN) is a metasyntax, that is, a formal way to describe formal languages. Originally proposed by Niklaus Wirth in 1977 as an alternative to Backus–Naur form (BNF). It has several advantages over BNF in that it contains an explicit iteration construct, and it avoids the use of an explicit symbol for the empty string (such as <empty> or ε).

WSN has been used in several international standards, starting with ISO 10303-21. It was also used to define the syntax of EXPRESS, the data modelling language of STEP.

== WSN defined in itself ==
 SYNTAX     = { PRODUCTION } .
 PRODUCTION = IDENTIFIER "=" EXPRESSION "." .
 EXPRESSION = TERM { "|" TERM } .
 TERM       = FACTOR { FACTOR } .
 FACTOR     = IDENTIFIER
            | LITERAL
            | "[" EXPRESSION "]"
            | "(" EXPRESSION ")"
            | "{" EXPRESSION "}" .
 IDENTIFIER = letter { letter } .
 LITERAL    = """" character { character } """" .

The equals sign indicates a production. The element on the left is defined to be the combination of elements on the right. A production is terminated by a full stop (period).

- Repetition is denoted by curly brackets, e.g., {a} stands for ε | a | aa | aaa | ....
- Optionality is expressed by square brackets, e.g., [a]b stands for ab | b.
- Parentheses serve for groupings, e.g., (a|b)c stands for ac | bc.

We take these concepts for granted today, but they were novel and even controversial in 1977. Wirth later incorporated some of the concepts (with a different syntax and notation) into extended Backus–Naur form.

Notice that letter and character are left undefined. This is because numeric characters (digits 0 to 9) may be included in both definitions or excluded from one, depending on the language being defined, e.g.:

 digit = "0" | "1" | "2" | "3" | "4" | "5" | "6" | "7" | "8" | "9" .
 upper-case = "A" | "B" | … | "Y" | "Z" .
 lower-case = "a" | "b" | … | "y" | "z" .
 letter = upper-case | lower-case .

If character goes on to include digit and other printable ASCII characters, then it diverges even more from letter, which one can assume does not include the digit characters or any of the special (non-alphanumeric) characters.

== Another example ==
The syntax of BNF can be represented with WSN as follows, based on translating the BNF example of itself:

 syntax         = rule [ syntax ] .
 rule           = opt-whitespace "<" rule-name ">" opt-whitespace "::=" 
                  opt-whitespace expression line-end .
 opt-whitespace = { " " } .
 expression     = list [ "|" expression ] .
 line-end       = opt-whitespace EOL | line-end line-end .
 list           = term [ opt-whitespace list ] .
 term           = literal | "<" rule-name ">" .
 literal        = """" text """" | "'" text "'" .

This definition appears overcomplicated because the concept of "optional whitespace" must be explicitly defined in BNF, but it is implicit in WSN. Even in this example, text is left undefined, but it is assumed to mean "ASCII-character { ASCII-character }". (EOL is also left undefined.) Notice how the kludge "<" rule-name ">" has been used twice because text was not explicitly defined.

One of the problems with BNF which this example illustrates is that by allowing both single-quote and double-quote characters to be used for a literal, there is an added potential for human error in attempting to create a machine-readable syntax. One of the concepts that migrated to later meta syntaxes was the idea that giving the user multiple choices made it harder to write parsers for grammars defined by the syntax, so computer languages in general have become more restrictive in how a quoted-literal is defined.

== Syntax diagram ==
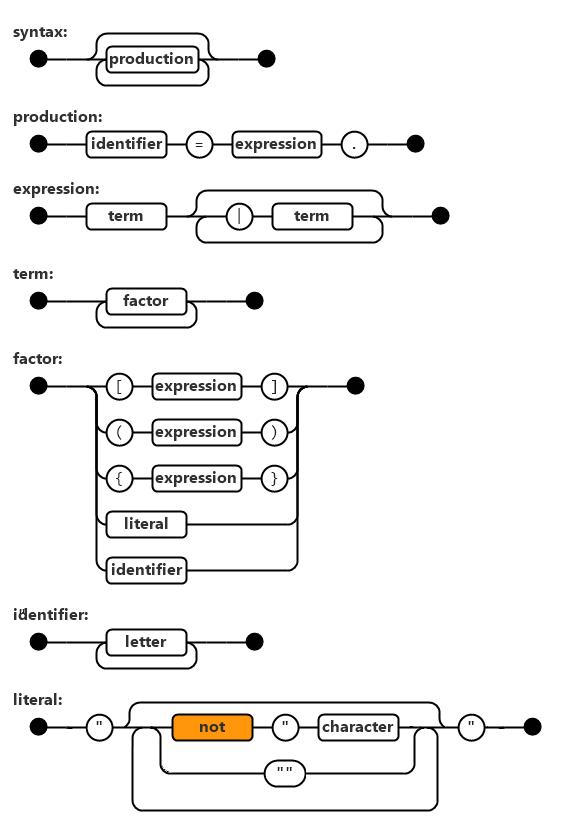
Syntax diagram:
