= Eventive =

Eventive may refer to:

- Eventive aspect, a class of grammatical aspect including perfective and imperfective aspect
- Eventive mood, a variant of the irrealis grammatical mood
- Eventive passive voice or dynamic passive voice, a variant of the passive voice

== See also ==
- Event (disambiguation)
