= GOLD (parser) =

GOLD Parsing System
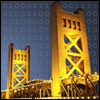

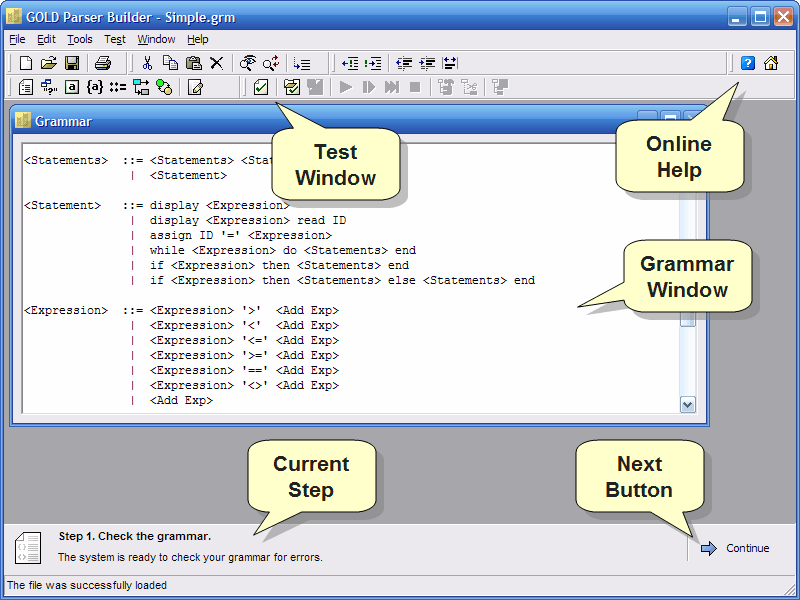
- Developer(s): Devin Cook and 54 other contributors
- Final release: 5.2.0 / August 18, 2012; 12 years ago
- Operating system: Windows
- Type: LALR parser
- License: zlib License (free software)
- Website: goldparser.org

GOLD is a free parsing system that is designed to support multiple programming languages.

== Design ==
The system uses a DFA for lexical analysis and the LALR algorithm for parsing. Both of these algorithms are state machines that use tables to determine actions. GOLD is designed around the principle of logically separating the process of generating the LALR and DFA parse tables from the actual implementation of the parsing algorithms themselves. This allows parsers to be implemented in different programming languages while maintaining the same grammars and development process.

The GOLD system consists of three logical components, the "Builder", the "Engine", and a "Compiled Grammar Table" file definition which functions as an intermediary between the Builder and the Engine.

=== Builder ===
GOLD Components

The Builder is the primary component and main application of the system. The Builder is used to analyze the syntax of a language (specified as a grammar) and construct LALR and DFA tables. During this process, any ambiguities in the grammar will be reported. This is essentially the same task that is performed by compiler-compilers such as YACC and ANTLR.

Once the LALR and DFA parse tables are successfully constructed, the Builder can save this data into a Compiled Grammar Table file. This allows the information to be reopened later by the Builder or used in one of the Engines. Currently, the Builder component is only available for Windows 32-bit operating systems.

Some of the features of the Builder are:

- Freeware license
- State browsing
- Integrated testing
- Test multiple files wizard
- Generate webpages (including hyperlinked syntax charts)
- Generate skeleton programs using templates
- Export grammars to YACC
- Export tables to XML or formatted text

=== Compiled Grammar Table file ===
The Compiled Grammar Table file is used to store table information generated by the Builder.

=== Engines ===
Unlike the Builder, which only runs on a single platform, the Engine component is written for a specific programming language and/or development platform. The Engine implements the LALR and DFA algorithms. Since different programming languages use different approaches to designing programs, each implementation of the Engine will vary. As a result, an implementation of the Engine written for Visual Basic 6 will differ greatly from one written for ANSI C.

Currently, Engines for GOLD have been implemented for the following programming languages / platforms. New Engines can be implemented using the source code for the existing Engines as the starting point.

- Assembly - Intel x86
- ANSI C
- C#
- D
- Delphi
- Java
- Pascal
- Python
- Visual Basic
- Visual Basic .NET
- Visual C++

== Grammars ==
GOLD grammars are based directly on Backus–Naur form, regular expressions, and set notation.

The following grammar defines the syntax for a minimal general-purpose programming language called "Simple".

"Name"    = 'Simple'
"Author"  = 'Devin Cook'
"Version" = '2.1' 
"About"   = 'This is a very simple grammar designed for use in examples'

"Case Sensitive" = False 
"Start Symbol"   = <Statements>

{String Ch 1} = {Printable} - ['']
{String Ch 2} = {Printable} - ["]

Identifier    = {Letter}{AlphaNumeric}*    

! String allows either single or double quotes

StringLiteral = ''  {String Ch 1}* ''
              | '"' {String Ch 2}* '"'

NumberLiteral = {Number}+('.'{Number}+)?

Comment Start = '/*'
Comment End   = '*/'
Comment Line  = '//' 

<Statements>  ::= <Statements> <Statement>
               |  <Statement>

<Statement>   ::= display <Expression>
               |  display <Expression> read ID
               |  assign ID '=' <Expression>
               |  while <Expression> do <Statements> end
               |  if <Expression> then <Statements> end
               |  if <Expression> then <Statements> else <Statements> end
               
<Expression>  ::= <Expression> '>'  <Add Exp>
               |  <Expression> '<'  <Add Exp>
               |  <Expression> '<=' <Add Exp>
               |  <Expression> '>=' <Add Exp>
               |  <Expression> '==' <Add Exp>
               |  <Expression> '<>' <Add Exp>
               |  <Add Exp>

<Add Exp>     ::= <Add Exp> '+' <Mult Exp>
               |  <Add Exp> '-' <Mult Exp>
               |  <Add Exp> '&' <Mult Exp>
               |  <Mult Exp>

<Mult Exp>    ::= <Mult Exp> '*' <Negate Exp>
               |  <Mult Exp> '/' <Negate Exp>
               |  <Negate Exp>

<Negate Exp>  ::= '-' <Value>
               |  <Value>

<Value>       ::= Identifier
               |  StringLiteral
               |  NumberLiteral
               |  '(' <Expression> ')'

== Development overview ==
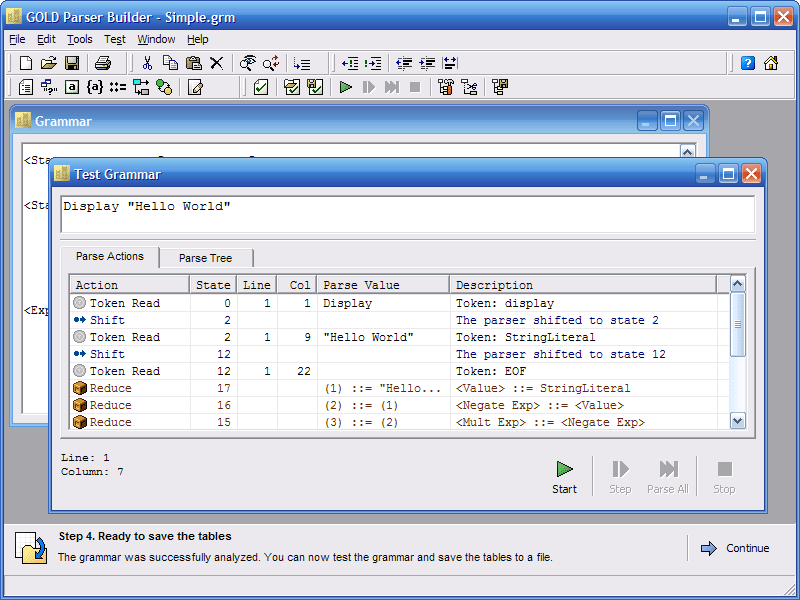
GOLD Builder Application

The first step consists of writing and testing a grammar for the language being parsed. The grammar can be written using any text editor - such as Notepad or the editor that is built into the Builder. At this stage, no coding is required.

Once the grammar is complete, it is analyzed by the Builder, the LALR and DFA parse tables are constructed, and any ambiguities or problems with the grammar are reported. Afterwards, the tables are saved to a Compiled Grammar Table file to be used later by a parsing engine. At this point, the GOLD Parser Builder is no longer needed.

In the final stage, the tables are read by an Engine. At this point, the development process is dependent on the selected implementation language.
