= Uncertain plural =

Technique marking plural ambiguity

An uncertain plural occurs when a writer does not know in advance whether a word should be written in the singular or plural. For English nouns, this may be demonstrated by enclosing the trailing plural or singular letters in parentheses or slashes, such as "is/are", "get(s)", "pose(s)", "fix/es", "book(s)", "answer/s" and "child(ren)".

In the case of articles, "they" or "their" may be used to include a single individual, when uncertain.

== See also ==
- Singular they
- Gender-neutral pronoun
