= The Event Group =

The Event Group is a strategic event management firm based in Calgary, Alberta, Canada. The company plans both local and national events in venues across Canada, and arranges keynote speakers and entertainers for events.

== History ==
The Event Group was founded in 1997.

The company has arranged talks by Alan Greenspan, General Colin Powell and Vice President Al Gore. Entertainers include Russell Brand, Jerry Seinfeld, Paul Anka, Bill Cosby, Art Garfunkel, Bonnie Raitt, Howie Mandel, Robin Williams and many others.

The Event Group has also arranged many events surrounding the Calgary Stampede. In 2012, the company took in about 10% of the entertainment spin-off money from the event, and in 2015, the Stampede generated about 10% of the company's revenue.

Because the Event Group arranges many events for companies involved in the oil industry, its business is strongly affected by the Alberta economy; economic declines caused by the drop in oil prices in 2009 and in 2015 led to many events being cancelled those years. The company also lost much of its Calgary business in 2013 because of disastrous flooding in the city.

After a weak business year in 2015 after collapsing oil prices affected Calgary businesses, The Event Group's revenue increased by about 30% in 2016.

Each year employees of The Event Group help organize the Field of Crosses memorial in Calgary for Remembrance Day.
