= Grouped events =

In philosophy, a grouped event is the experience of two or more events that occur in sequence or concurrently that can be subsequently categorized.

== Description ==
Grouped events can fall into categories depending upon whether the events are causal or acausal (noncausal), and are with or without meaning (significance). Causal events are related as the subsequent event(s) are understood to be a consequence of the prior event(s). Meaning represents the purpose or significance of something.

Causality represents causal events grouped without meaning. These are common events.

Coincidence represents acausal events grouped without meaning. These are less common events.

== Examples ==
A causality example is to strike a cue ball with a pool stick to make it move. The result is expected and has no meaning.

A coincidence example is two friends from the same town finding each other at the same time in the town's library without any planning. The result is unexpected yet has no meaning (significance).

== Criticisms and interpretations ==
Determinism theory argues against acausal events. Causality appears to us to be reasonably objective to determine on the macroscopic scale. (But not on the quantum scale, where random chance prevails.) However, even large-scale physical causality is a somewhat mysterious notion; there is no general theory of causality in physics, and most events in physics are theoretically reversible in time. However, the second law of thermodynamics (which states that entropy always increases with time, in any closed system) can be regarded as providing a direction for the "arrow of time" and thus entropy may be related to the physically mysterious notion of causality. (See Causality (physics).) The outlier effect can be used to explain events that are unlikely to occur by chance. Littlewood's law states that individuals can statistically expect a significant event to happen for them at a frequency of about once per month. Littlewood assumes a significant event frequency at one in a million with a duration of one second, and that an individual is alert to significant events for eight hours per day.

== See also ==
- Causality
- Coincidence
- Meaning (non-linguistic)
- Outlier
- Littlewood's law
- Determinism
