= Augmented Backus–Naur form =

Metalanguage based on Backus–Naur Form (BNF)

In computer science, augmented Backus–Naur form (ABNF) is a metalanguage based on Backus–Naur form (BNF) but consisting of its own syntax and derivation rules. The motivation for ABNF is to define an easily usable tool for defining the format of communications protocol payload objects and protocol units. It is defined by Internet Standard 68 ("STD 68", type case sic), which as of December 2010 was RFC 5234, and it often serves as the definition language for IETF communication protocols.

RFC 5234 supersedes RFC 4234, 2234 and 733. RFC 7405 updates it, adding a syntax for specifying case-sensitive string literals.

== Overview ==
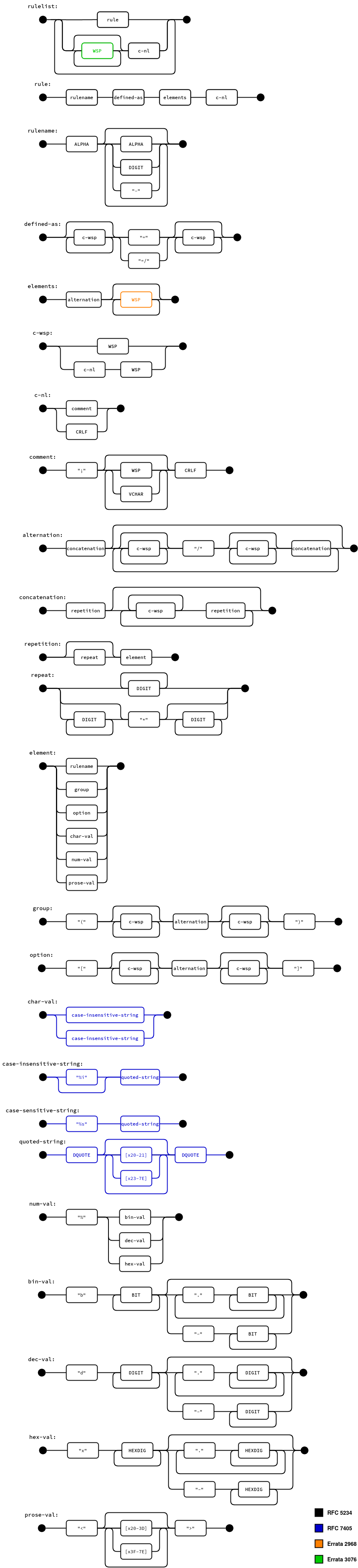
ABNF syntax diagram of ABNF rules

An ABNF specification is a set of derivation rules, written as

rule = definition; comment CR LF

where rule is a case-insensitive nonterminal, the definition consists of sequences of symbols that define the rule, a comment for documentation, and ending with a carriage return and line feed.

Rule names are case-insensitive: <rulename>, <Rulename>, <RULENAME>, and <rUlENamE> all refer to the same rule. Rule names consist of a letter followed by letters, numbers, and hyphens.

Angle brackets (<, >) are not required around rule names (as they are in BNF). However, they may be used to delimit a rule name when used in prose to discern a rule name.

== Terminal values ==
Terminal symbols are the basic building blocks in ABNF. The nonterminal symbols are built on top of them. They specify a sequence of characters that are literally matched. (Technically the actual terminal symbol in ABNF is the individual character [which to ABNF is no more than a non-negative integer], but for ease of writing the syntax has been extended to allow matching sequences of characters.)

Terminal values may be specified numerically, in which case it corresponds to a character code or a sequence of codes. Such a value is specified as the percent sign %, followed by the base (b = binary, d = decimal, and x = hexadecimal), followed by the value, or concatenation of values (indicated by .). For example, a carriage return is specified by %d13 in decimal or %x0D in hexadecimal. A carriage return followed by a line feed may be specified with concatenation as %d13.10.

Literal text is specified through the use of a string enclosed in quotation marks ("). These strings are case-insensitive, and the character set used is (US-)ASCII. Therefore, the string "abc" will match "abc", "Abc", "aBc", "abC", "ABc", "AbC", "aBC", and "ABC". RFC 7405 added a syntax for case-sensitive strings: %s"aBc" will only match "aBc". Prior to that, a case-sensitive string could only be specified by listing the individual characters: to match "aBc", the definition would be %d97.66.99. A string can also be explicitly specified as case-insensitive with a %i prefix.

A further type of building-block value is the "prose-val", a bracketed string describing what a rule is meant to match in natural language prose. However, ABNF grammars using prose-vals cannot be automatically implemented into a parser program without human input, and are therefore generally only used as a last resort.

== Operators ==
=== White space ===
White space is used to separate elements of a definition; for space to be recognized as a delimiter, it must be explicitly included. The explicit reference for a single whitespace character is WSP (linear white space), and LWSP is for zero or more whitespace characters with newlines permitted.

Definitions are left-aligned. When multiple lines are required (for readability), continuation lines are indented by whitespace.

=== Comment ===
; comment

A semicolon (;) starts a comment that continues to the end of the line.

=== Concatenation ===
Rule1 Rule2

A rule may be defined by listing a sequence of rule names.

To match the string “aba”, the following rules could be used:

- fu = %x61 ; a
- bar = %x62 ; b
- mumble = fu bar fu

=== Alternative ===
Rule1 / Rule2

A rule may be defined by a list of alternative rules separated by a solidus (/).

To accept the rule fu or the rule bar, the following rule could be constructed:

- fubar = fu / bar

=== Incremental alternatives ===
Rule1 =/ Rule2

Additional alternatives may be added to a rule through the use of =/ between the rule name and the definition.

The rule

- ruleset = alt1 / alt2
- ruleset =/ alt3
- ruleset =/ alt4 / alt5

is therefore equivalent to

- ruleset = alt1 / alt2 / alt3 / alt4 / alt5

=== Value range ===
%c##-##

A range of numeric values may be specified through the use of a hyphen (-).

The rule

- OCTAL = %x30-37

is equivalent to

- OCTAL = "0" / "1" / "2" / "3" / "4" / "5" / "6" / "7"

=== Sequence group ===
(Rule1 Rule2)

Elements may be placed in parentheses to group rules in a definition.

To match "a b d" or "a c d", the following rule could be constructed:

- group = a (b / c) d

To match “a b” or “c d”, the following rules could be constructed:

- group = a b / c d
- group = (a b) / (c d)

=== Variable repetition ===
n*nRule

To indicate repetition of an element, the form <a>*<b>element is used. The optional <a> gives the minimal number of elements to be included (with the default of 0). The optional <b> gives the maximum number of elements to be included (with the default of infinity).

Use *element for zero or more elements, *1element for zero or one element, 1*element for one or more elements, and 2*3element for two or three elements, cf. regular expressions e*, e?, e+ and e{2,3}.

=== Specific repetition ===
nRule

To indicate an explicit number of elements, the form <a>element is used and is equivalent to <a>*<a>element.

Use 2DIGIT to get two numeric digits, and 3DIGIT to get three numeric digits. (DIGIT is defined below under "Core rules". Also see zip-code in the example below.)

=== Optional sequence ===
[Rule]

To indicate an optional element, the following constructions are equivalent:

- [fubar snafu]
- *1(fubar snafu)
- 0*1(fubar snafu)

=== Operator precedence ===
The following operators have the given precedence from tightest binding to loosest binding:

1. Strings, names formation
2. Comment
3. Value range
4. Repetition
5. Grouping, optional
6. Concatenation
7. Alternative

Use of the alternative operator with concatenation may be confusing, and it is recommended that grouping be used to make explicit concatenation groups.

== Core rules ==
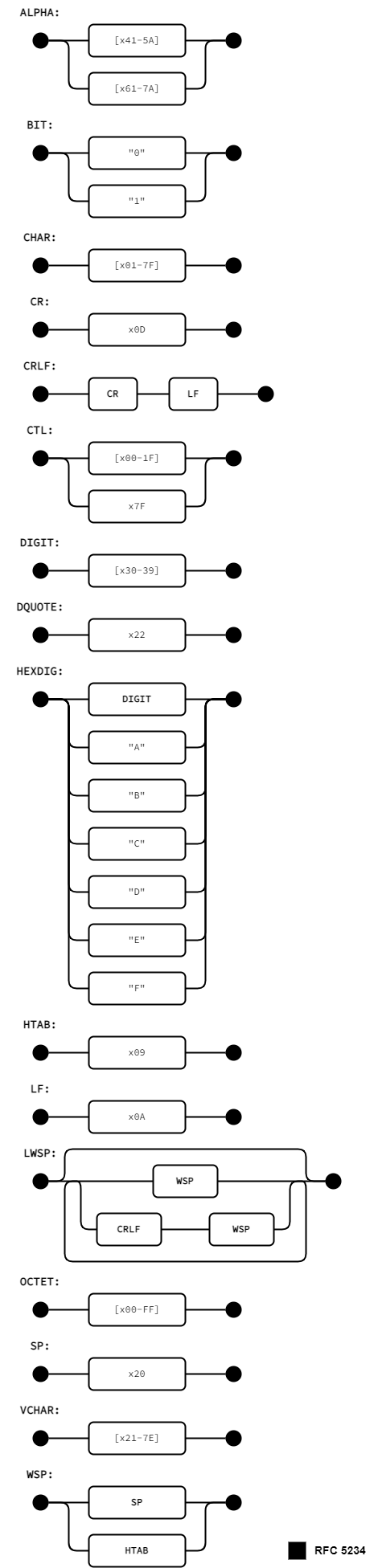
ABNF syntax diagram of core rules.

The core rules are defined in the ABNF standard. They provide definitions for commonly-used constructs. The exact content of the core rules depends on the code page in use, but for the Internet's common baseline of 7-bit ASCII (or a superset of it), it is defined as:

Rule	Formal definition	Meaning
ALPHA	%x41-5A / %x61-7A	Upper- and lower-case ASCII letters (A–Z, a–z)
DIGIT	%x30-39	Decimal digits (0–9)
HEXDIG	DIGIT / "A" / "B" / "C" / "D" / "E" / "F"	Hexadecimal digits (0–9, A–F, a–f)
DQUOTE	%x22	Double quote
SP	%x20	Space
HTAB	%x09	Horizontal tab
WSP	SP / HTAB	Space and horizontal tab
LWSP	*(WSP / CRLF WSP)	Linear white space (past newline)
VCHAR	%x21-7E	Visible (printing) characters
CHAR	%x01-7F	Any ASCII character, excluding NUL
OCTET	%x00-FF	8 bits of data (any byte)
CTL	%x00-1F / %x7F	Controls
CR	%x0D	Carriage return
LF	%x0A	Linefeed
CRLF	CR LF	Internet-standard newline
BIT	"0" / "1"	Binary digit

=== LWSP ===
The ABNF language originated in RFC 733, the 1977 standard for ARPA NETWORK TEXT MESSAGES, an early form of email. It defined the "linear-white-space" as a deliminator in mail headers:

linear-white-space = 1*([CRLF] LWSP-char)  ; similar to modern LWSP
LWSP-char          = SPACE / HTAB          ; equivalent to modern WSP

The ABNF language was described independently of email in RFC 2234 of 1997. It included the "LWSP" rule in the modern form, which does not have the 1 part specifying the minimum repetition. This is quite unusual because logically speaking, at least one whitespace character is needed to form a delimiter between two fields. This difference was noticed in RFC Erratum 3096 of 2012 (filed for RFC 5234, which inherited this construct), but by then it was too late to change the definition as other standards had already used the LWSP rule for their own purposes.

RFC 5234 of 2008 adds a warning in conjunction to the definition of LWSP as follows, referring to its departure from email standards:

Use of this linear-white-space rule permits lines containing only white space that are no longer legal in mail headers and have caused interoperability problems in other contexts. Do not use when defining mail headers and use with caution in other contexts.

The contemporary email standard, RFC 5322 of 2008, does not use such a term as "linear white space", nor does it use the predefined LWSP value. In its place it uses folding whitespace (FWS):

FWS             =   ([*WSP CRLF] 1*WSP) /  obs-FWS
                                          ; Folding white space
obs-FWS         =   1*WSP *(CRLF 1*WSP)   ; Obsolete folding white space
                                          ; equivalent to: LWSP-char [linear-white-space] (RFC 733 rules)
                                          ; equivalent to: WSP LWSP (modern core rules)

== Examples ==
=== US postal address ===
The (U.S.) postal address example given in the augmented Backus–Naur form (ABNF) page may be specified as follows:

postal-address   = name-part street zip-part

name-part        = *(personal-part SP) last-name [SP suffix] CRLF
name-part        =/ personal-part CRLF

personal-part    = first-name / (initial ".")
first-name       = *ALPHA
initial          = ALPHA
last-name        = *ALPHA
suffix           = ("Jr." / "Sr." / 1*("I" / "V" / "X"))

street           = [apt SP] house-num SP street-name CRLF
apt              = 1*4DIGIT
house-num        = 1*8(DIGIT / ALPHA)
street-name      = 1*VCHAR

zip-part         = town-name "," SP state 1*2SP zip-code CRLF
town-name        = 1*(ALPHA / SP)
state            = 2ALPHA
zip-code         = 5DIGIT ["-" 4DIGIT]

=== ABNF representation of itself ===
ABNF's syntax itself may be represented with a ABNF like the following:

rulelist       =  1*( rule / (*WSP c-nl) )

rule           =  rulename defined-as elements c-nl
                       ; continues if next line starts
                       ;  with white space

rulename       =  ALPHA *(ALPHA / DIGIT / "-")

defined-as     =  *c-wsp ("=" / "=/") *c-wsp
                       ; basic rules definition and
                       ;  incremental alternatives

elements       =  alternation *WSP

c-wsp          =  WSP / (c-nl WSP)

c-nl           =  comment / CRLF
                       ; comment or newline

comment        =  ";" *(WSP / VCHAR) CRLF

alternation    =  concatenation
                  *(*c-wsp "/" *c-wsp concatenation)

concatenation  =  repetition *(1*c-wsp repetition)

repetition     =  [repeat] element

repeat         =  1*DIGIT / (*DIGIT "*" *DIGIT)

element        =  rulename / group / option /
                  char-val / num-val / prose-val

group          =  "(" *c-wsp alternation *c-wsp ")"

option         =  "[" *c-wsp alternation *c-wsp "]"

char-val       =  DQUOTE *(%x20-21 / %x23-7E) DQUOTE
                       ; quoted string of SP and VCHAR
                       ;  without DQUOTE

num-val        =  "%" (bin-val / dec-val / hex-val)

bin-val        =  "b" 1*BIT
                  [ 1*("." 1*BIT) / ("-" 1*BIT) ]
                       ; series of concatenated bit values
                       ;  or single ONEOF range

dec-val        =  "d" 1*DIGIT
                  [ 1*("." 1*DIGIT) / ("-" 1*DIGIT) ]

hex-val        =  "x" 1*HEXDIG
                  [ 1*("." 1*HEXDIG) / ("-" 1*HEXDIG) ]

prose-val      =  "<" *(%x20-3D / %x3F-7E) ">"
                       ; bracketed string of SP and VCHAR
                       ;  without angles
                       ; prose description, to be used as
                       ;  last resort
