= Event (UML) =

An event in the Unified Modeling Language (UML) is "something that may occur at a specific instant in time".

Events can, but do not necessarily, cause state transitions from one state to another in state machines represented by state machine diagrams.

Consider "the case of two Transitions originating from the same State, triggered by the same event, but with different guards. If that event occurs and both guard conditions are true, then at most one of those Transitions can fire in a given run-to-completion step."
