= Ajay Data =

Indian entrepreneur (born 1973)

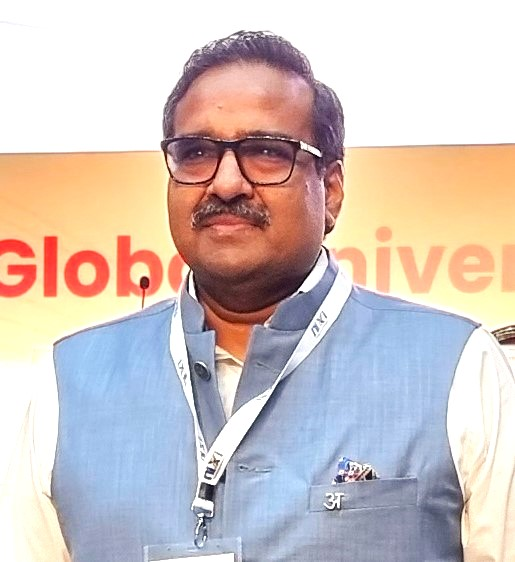
- Born: 22 March 1973 (age 53); Khairthal, India
- Occupation: CEO Data Ingenious Global Limited
- Spouse: Nidhie A Data
- Children: 2
- Awards: Aegis Graham Bell Award for best innovation in Enterprise Solution Category 2017

Ajay Data is an Indian entrepreneur with interest in IT, Edible Oil and Handball. He is elected Chair of Universal Acceptance Steering Group (UASG). Data led the creation of one of the world's first linguistic email address mobile apps for Internationalized Domain Names domains. He provided leadership as chair to bring Nepal, Sri Lanka, Bangladesh and Indian language Top level domain (TLD) into root servers. He has been recently credited with Graham Bell Award for this innovation and Pt Deendayal Upadhyay Excellence Award for work in languages and script. ICANN-UASG case study explains and talk about it in detail. He had proposed a standard for downgrading with Alias, which was accepted and recommended as best practice by Universal Acceptance Steering Group. His mobile app provides access email access in 19 languages including Cyrillic, Arabic, Thai, Mandarin, Korean and 15 Indian languages. which is available through DataMail app.

== Early life and education ==
Ajay Data was born on 22 March 1973 in Khairthal, Alwar District Rajasthan. After completing his school education from Indra Happy School and Government Higher Secondary School, Khairthal, he moved to Jaipur for college studies.

After completion of his studies in 1999, Data founded Data Infosys Ltd, now called as Data Ingenious Global Ltd, in Rajasthan.

== Ajay Data @ ICANN ==
He was co-chair of ICANN Neo Brahmi Generation Panel. He was EAI Coordinator in UASG.TECH and Member of ISPCP Constituency. He is also member of Expert Panel for Root Zone LGR application. He has been appointed (first Indian) for ccNSO Council by NOMCOM for the term to start from Oct 2018. In March 2020 results were announced by UASG where he was unopposed elected chairman for UASG for 2021 to 2023.

== Other Associations ==
Data has been part of RITEG (Rajasthan IT Entrepreuners Group), Founder & President TiE Rajasthan, Founder President YEO Jaipur (now known as EO), Nasscom, Data Security Council of India, Jaipur Citizen Forum, Advisory board of AIESEC, board member of Faculty of Management Studies (Poddar College) - Rajasthan University, Mentor in Rajasthan Venture Capital Fund, PHD Chamber of Commerce & Industry - Rajasthan, Chamber of Commerce & Industry, FICCI - Rajasthan. Member - Rajasthan Angel Investors Network (RAIN).

He was part of a business delegation led by the Prime Minister of India Manmohan Singh.

He has been appointed Chair of Pre-IIGF; First event of Govt of India on Internet Governance Forum, which is part of UNs IGF.

He is the Chairman of Premier Handball League, India.

== Multilingual Internet@India ==
Data has been part of volunteers panel created by ICANN named Neo Brahmi Generation Panel which created label generation rules for Top Level Domain names to enable official language of Nepal, Bangladesh, Sri Lanka and India.

Data was appointed member by Ministry of Electronics & Information Technology &, Govt of India in Stake Holder group] for Universa Acceptance and Multilingual Internet.

== Book: Zenith: Mastering AI for Everyday Life and Work ==
In May 2025, Data released his new book, Zenith: Mastering AI for Everyday Life and Work, published by Rupa Publications India. The book, available on platforms like Amazon, serves as a comprehensive guide for individuals from various backgrounds, including professionals, entrepreneurs, and students, to understand and effectively utilize artificial intelligence without requiring prior technical expertise. It focuses on practical applications and prompt engineering to enhance productivity and foster innovation.

== Awards and honours ==
- The "Man to Watch in 2004" by Times of India
- Lufthansa "Pioneering Spirit" - ET NOW - 2011
- "Rajasthan Gaurav" - Sanskriti - Jaipur, Rajasthan - 2013
- Ministers of Change- CNBC 18 TV
- IT Innovator of the Year - Peter Hass, US Indo American Society. 2013
- Rajasthan Ke SuperStar by ETV Rajasthan. 2013
- IT innovator of the Year - Business Rankers Magazine 2015
- Shaan-E-Rajasthan - Felicitated by Governor of Rajasthan
- On the cover of CIO Review - May 2016
- Tech face of Rajasthan
- Graham Bell Award for best innovation in Enterprise Solution Category 2017
- Co-chair NBGP - Neo Brahami General Panel - ICANN
- Chairman Assocham Rajasthan
