= ThaiURL =

Technology enabling domain names in Thai

ThaiURL (Thai Uniform Resource Locator) is a technology enabling the use of Thai domain names in applications that have been modified to support this technology. It is one of several such systems that were marketed before the advent of IDNA.

Traditionally, the Domain Name System (DNS), does not allow domain names with Thai characters. The only characters allowed in DNS names, as specified in RFC 1034 “Domain names - concepts and facilities” and RFC 1035 “Domain names - implementation and specification”, are

1. Letter: “a” through “z” (case insensitive)
2. Digit: “0” through “9”
3. Hyphen (-)

The ThaiURL domain naming standard is based on Thai characters and symbols as specified in TIS 620-2533: Standard for Thai Character Codes for Computers. Since these are non-ASCII characters, Row-based ASCII Compatible Encoding is used. The encoding process is as follows:

1. Begin with a Thai domain name as input:
  ชื่อไทย.คอม
2. Convert the Thai characters into their Unicode code points in hexadecimal:
  0e0a 0e37 0e48 0e2d 0e44 0e17 0e22 . 0e04 0e2d 0e21 (spaces are added here to show individual code points)
  0e0a0e370e480e2d0e440e170e22.0e040e2d0e21 (actual hex string)
3. Convert the hex characters to binary:
  0000 1110 0000 1010 0011 0111 0100 1000 0010 1101 0100 0100 0001 0111 0010 0010 . 0000 1110 0000 0100 0010 1101 0010 0001 (spaces added to show individual hex characters)
4. Perform a Base32 conversion:
  00001 11000 00101 00011 01110 10010 00001 01101 01000 10000 01011 10010 00100 . 00001 11000 00010 00010 11010 01000 01000 (binary representation)
  byfdosbniqlse.bycc2ii (ASCII representation)
5. Append TLD:
  byfdosbniqlse.bycc2ii.net

This kind of URL encoding is not a national standard, but rather a system used by the domain name registrar ThaiURL.com. It is one of many localized naming schemes that predate standardisation of Internationalized domain names (IDNA); at the moment the two systems appear to coexist. The ccTLD name registrar for .th, thnic.net, supports IDNA; ThaiURL registers .com names.

However, because this is not an ICANN-sanctioned IDN encoding method, support is limited. Most browsers will use still default to punycode for encoding Thai domain names, so the only way to reach ThaiURL-registered domains is by typing in or linking to the ASCII-encoded domain name.
