= Foxmail =

E-mail client software

- Original author(s): Allen Zhang (张小龙)
- Developer(s): Tencent
Stable release
- Windows: 7.2.25 / September 15, 2022; 2 years ago
- macOS: 1.5.6 / December 13, 2021; 3 years ago
- Operating system: Microsoft Windows and macOS
- Available in: English and Chinese
- Type: E-mail client
- License: Proprietary software with Terms of Use
- Website: https://www.foxmail.com/

Foxmail is a freeware e-mail client developed by Tencent.

== History ==
Foxmail was originally written by Allen Zhang (张小龙), an alumnus of Huazhong University of Science and Technology in Wuhan. Foxmail was acquired in 2005 by Tencent Holdings.

== Usage ==
According to a 2001 Sina.com survey, Foxmail had a 32.92% market share in China. In 2003, in a joint press-release with Verisign promoting Internationalized domain names, the authors' reported over 3 million daily Foxmail users in China. (For perspective, the CNNIC reported a total number of 35 million Internet users in China in January 2002.) Foxmail tutorials are found in several Internet literacy books for the Chinese market.

== Reviews ==
The Dutch edition of PC Magazine reported that version 6.0 of Foxmail occasionally sends email usage data to datacollect.foxmail.com.cn, but otherwise generally described it as an "excellent email client", recommending version 5.0.8 (the last one before the acquisition), which is not affected by this issue.

Foxmail 5 violates RFC 822 (and 2822, 5322) by putting 8-bit characters in the subject and address header fields. It is said to support Chinese Domain Name standards from RFC3454, RFC3490, RFC3491, and RFC3492 published in March 2003 by IETF.
