= Universal Acceptance =

Term by Ram Mohan

Universal Acceptance Steering Group (UASG)
- Founded: February 12, 2015; 11 years ago in Dubai, UAE
- Key people: Ram Mohan; Richard Merdinger]]; Edmon Chung; Mark Svancarek
- Owner: ICANN
- Website: uasg.tech

Universal Acceptance (UA) is a term coined by Ram Mohan to represent the principle that every top-level domain (TLD) should function within all applications regardless of script, number of characters, or how new it is.

Historically, there were a limited number of TLDs available in strings of two or three Latin-script characters. This began to change in 2000, when ICANN introduced new generic top-level domains (gTLDs) that were longer than three characters, such as .info and .museum. ICANN began to address these issues through initiatives such as creating a Universal Acceptance Toolkit in 2006, which provided reference code to software developers on how to cater for all TLDs correctly.

In 2010, the first internationalised domain names (IDNs), or domain names using non-Latin characters, were introduced. In 2013, ICANN's New gTLD Program introduced over 1,000 new gTLDs to its root. This expansion of the Domain Name System’s Root Zone further exacerbated challenges associated with universal acceptance of these domain names. For the principles of Universal Acceptance to be realized, all valid domain names and email addresses must be accepted, validated, stored, processed and displayed correctly and consistently by all Internet-enabled applications, devices and systems.

== Universal Acceptance Steering Group ==
In February 2015, Ram Mohan founded the Universal Acceptance Steering Group (UASG) at the ICANN52 meeting in Singapore, following efforts at organizing the IDN community at the ICANN IDN symposium in Dubai. The first face to face meeting of the UASG was held at the ICANN53 meeting in Buenos Aires. The UASG has grown into a community-led program, supported by ICANN, aimed at facilitating the adoption of Universal Acceptance principles by the industry.

== Mohan's Laws of Universal Acceptance ==
In 2002, Ram Mohan, then CTO of the .INFO TLD, experienced the first instances of Universal Acceptance problems, and crafted three laws that appeared valid in the domain name space:

1. An old TLD will be accepted more often than a new TLD.
2. An ASCII-only TLD will be accepted more than an IDN TLD.
3. A two or three letter TLD will be accepted more often than a longer ccTLD or gTLD.

As of 2024, these laws appear to still hold true. The success of Universal Acceptance would result in these laws becoming obsolete.

== Universal Acceptance of popular web browsers ==
One of the primary ways of interfacing with the Internet is through web browsers. For this reason, the UASG commissioned a report on the performance of major browsers in the treatment and acceptance of 17 different domain names registered for the purpose of providing test cases for UA readiness.

The study found that desktop browsers generally performed well, but only Internet Explorer performed as expected. Common problems among the other browsers included the failure to properly render the URLs in the tab title bar and failing to treat an ideographic full stop as a delimiter. On mobile platforms, the results of the tests were much more varied, with the same browsers performing differently based on the operating system, with one of the most common problems being the proper display of Unicode URLs.

The study concluded that developers are making progress in making browsers UA Ready, but there is more work to do on every browser except Internet Explorer, a browser that has been discontinued.

== Email address internalization ==
Internationalized email address is also part of Universal Acceptance Steering Group, where Email Service providers are motivated to start providing email address for IDNs and also engage them to solve issues related to interoperability with legacy systems. Downgrading is not recommended using punycode however providing ASCII Alias email address with EAI is the recommended practice. Aliasing as downgrading technique is being practiced by BSNL, which used XgenPlus email solution.

== Internationalized Domain Names (IDNs) ==
Internationalized Domain Names (IDNs) are linked to Universal Acceptance, because TLDs in local languages are always more than 3 letters long, and often do not work well in browsers, emails and other internet applications. One of the earliest groups recognizing the importance of IDNs and problems with Universal Acceptance was the Arabic Script IDN Working Group (ASIWG). Operated by Afilias' Ram Mohan, ASIWG aims to develop a unified IDN table for the Arabic script, and is an example of community collaboration that helps local and regional experts engage in global policy development, as well as technical standardization.It is reasonable to infer, therefore, that the usage growth could have been even more significant if DNS was available in Arabic characters.

== Leadership at Universal Acceptance Steering Group ==
Leaders for UASG are chosen every two years by vote. In February 2015, Ram Mohan was elected chair, and Edmon Chung, Richard Merdinger and Mark Svancarek were elected vice chairs. In February 2017, Ram Mohan was reelected Chair, with the same slate as 2015. In March 2019, Ajay Data was elected Chair and Dusan Stojicevic, Mark Svancarek and Dennis Tan Tanaka were elected vice chairs. In 2021 Ajay Data was reelected Chair of along with Dr. U.B. Pavanaja and Abdalmonem Galila as vice chairs. In 2023, Anil Jain was elected as new Chair along with Nitin Walia and Nabil Benamar as vice chairs.

== Working groups ==
In 2019, UASG created working groups with community leaders and volunteers to better manage the groups works.

- Technology Working Group
- Email Address Internationalization
- Communications
- Measurement
- Local Initiatives

== UA Day ==
In 2022, ICANN and the UASG announced their intention to celebrate the UA Day, starting with the first one on 28 March 2023.

== Transparency and Openness ==
While the UASG was founded and run on the principle of transparency and openness, by the early 2020s, the membership of the group became opaque. Many new email addresses with anonymous addresses joined the group, with little to no participation. The allegations were investigated, the current leadership viewed it as an important issue towards transparency and openness measures, and made recommendations including the publication of a Statement of Interest of each UASG member.

In 2025, ICANN publicly announced and appreciated the efforts made by UASG and its leadership. Further ICANN announced convening a Universal Acceptance Expert Working Group to provide guidance on its UA adoption work.

In 2025, ICANN announced its cessation of support for the UASG, and the transition to a new President's Committee on Universal Acceptance.

== UNESCO and ICANN Collaboration on Universal Acceptance ==
The United Nations Educational, Scientific and Cultural Organization (UNESCO) and the Internet Corporation for Assigned Names and Numbers (ICANN) are collaborating since 2025 to advance linguistic diversity online and digital inclusion by promoting the global adoption of Universal Acceptance (UA). Through a formal partnership, both organizations work together to raise awareness, support policy development, and strengthen the use of Internationalized Domain Names (IDNs) and email addresses so that all languages and scripts can function fully online. This collaboration includes annual joint activities around UA Day, bringing together governments, technical communities, civil society and language communities to discuss the barriers and opportunities for multilingual Internet use. It also includes the joint UNESCO-ICANN Policy Brief Advancing Universal Acceptance of all domain names and email addresses for a multilingual internet , which offers recommendations to policymakers on integrating UA into national digital strategies, public services and procurement, and on supporting underrepresented languages in the digital environment.

UNESCO’s 2003 Recommendation concerning the Promotion and Use of Multilingualism and Universal Access to Cyberspace provides the normative basis for this work, and Universal Acceptance has since been integrated into its Member State fifth monitoring cycle (2025), so that countries report on progress in enabling all languages and scripts online. By linking UA to the monitoring of the 2003 Recommendation, the collaboration contributes to the goals of the International Decade of Indigenous Languages (2022-2032), encouraging Member States to remove technical barriers that keep Indigenous languages offline. By linking UA to the monitoring of the 2003 Recommendation, the collaboration contributes to the goals of the International Decade of Indigenous Languages (2022-2032), encouraging Member States to remove technical barriers that keep Indigenous languages offline.
