= CDNC =

CDNC may refer to:

- California Digital Newspaper Collection, a Californian newspaper archive
- Chinese Domain Name Consortium, a Chinese collaboration to come up with a method for allowing Chinese characters in domain names
