= Dragon scale binding =

Traditional Chinese bookbinding technique

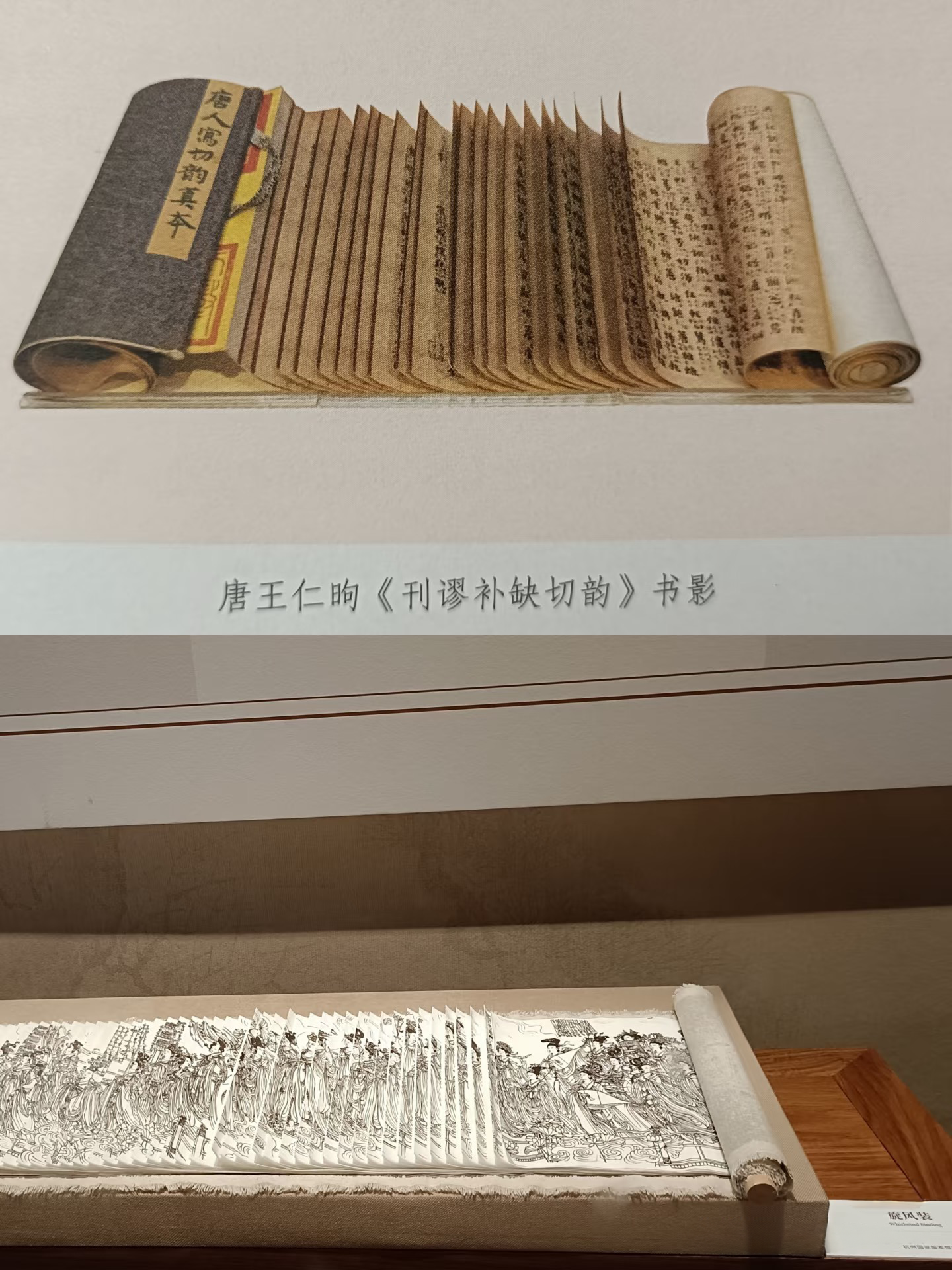
Ancient Book with Dragon Scale Binding

Dragon scale binding (Chinese: 龙鳞装; pinyin: lóng lín zhuāng), also known as dragon scale scroll or whirlwind binding, is a traditional Chinese bookbinding technique in which pages are attached in overlapping tiers resembling the scales of a dragon. It is regarded as one of the most distinctive transitional formats in the evolution of Chinese book structures between the ancient scroll and the later folded or stitched formats.

== Origin ==
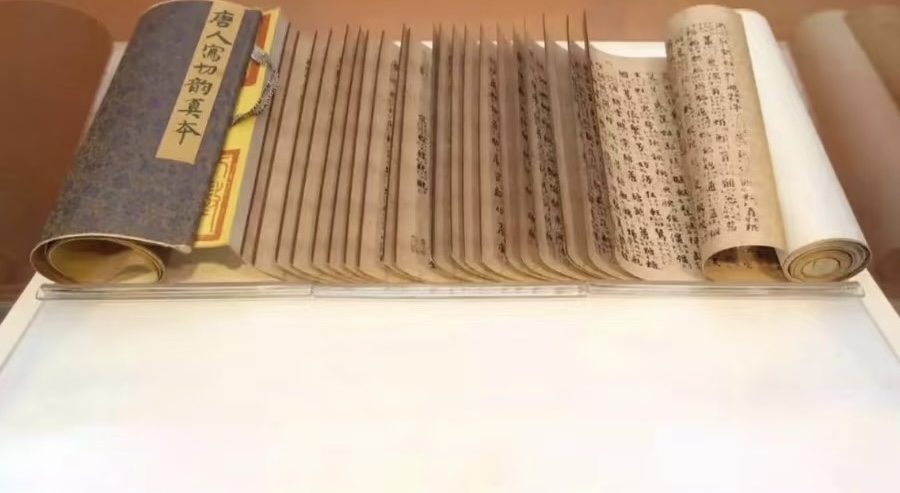
The earliest extant example of Dragon Scale Binding (Kanmiu Buque Qieyun), held by the Palace Museum.

In codicological literature, dragon scale binding is categorized within the lineage of Chinese manuscript and bookbinding forms. Scholars describe it as a uniquely Chinese structural innovation that developed during the transition from scrolls to folded book formats in China, with no parallel developmental lineage in neighbouring regions.

Dragon scale binding originated during the Tang and Song dynasties, a period marked by experimentation with diverse book formats in China. The technique belongs to a group of transitional structures created as Chinese book production shifted from scrolls to multi-leaf bound forms.

Modern studies identify dragon scale binding (longlin zhuang) as a format used primarily for Buddhist sutras, painting albums, genealogical manuscripts, and imperial documents—materials that benefited from continuous, segmented, or panoramic presentation.

Alternate English names include:

- Dragon scale scroll
- Whirlwind binding
- Scaled page binding
- Overlapping page binding

== Structure and technique ==
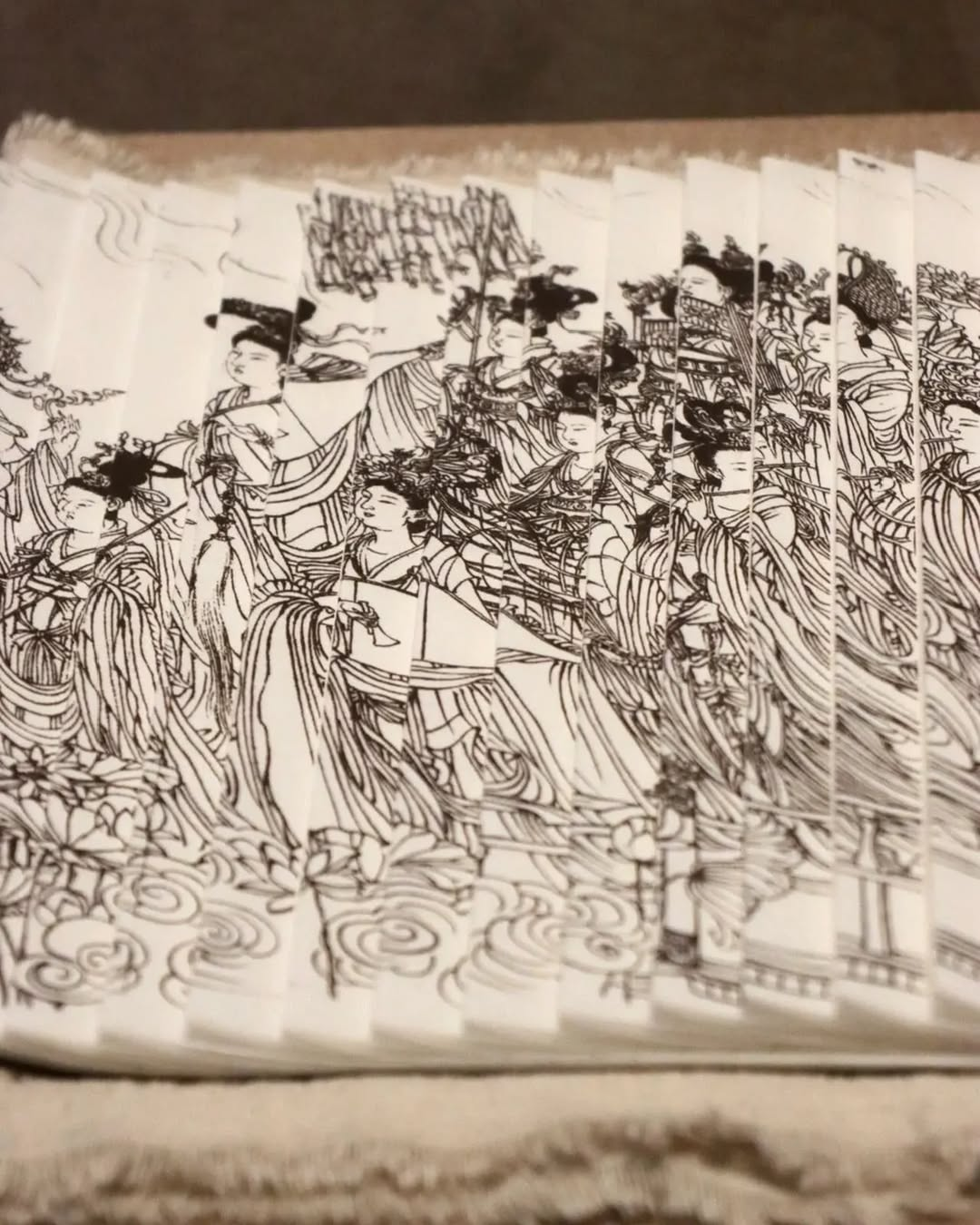
Dragon-Scale Bound Ancient Book — National Edition Museum, Hangzhou

Dragon scale binding is characterized by:

- a sequence of leaves that overlap beneath the previous leaf
- the ability to unfold into a long segmented strip resembling a scroll
- a compact codex-like form when closed
- use of materials such as silk-backed xuan paper, gold-fleck decorative paper, and wooden or silk-covered boards
- It is also historically referred to as whirlwind binding (Chinese: 旋风装), due to the rotational motion of the overlapping leaves when the scroll is rolled up.

This construction allows continuous texts and images to be viewed in an extended format while maintaining the convenience of folded storage.

== Cultural significance ==
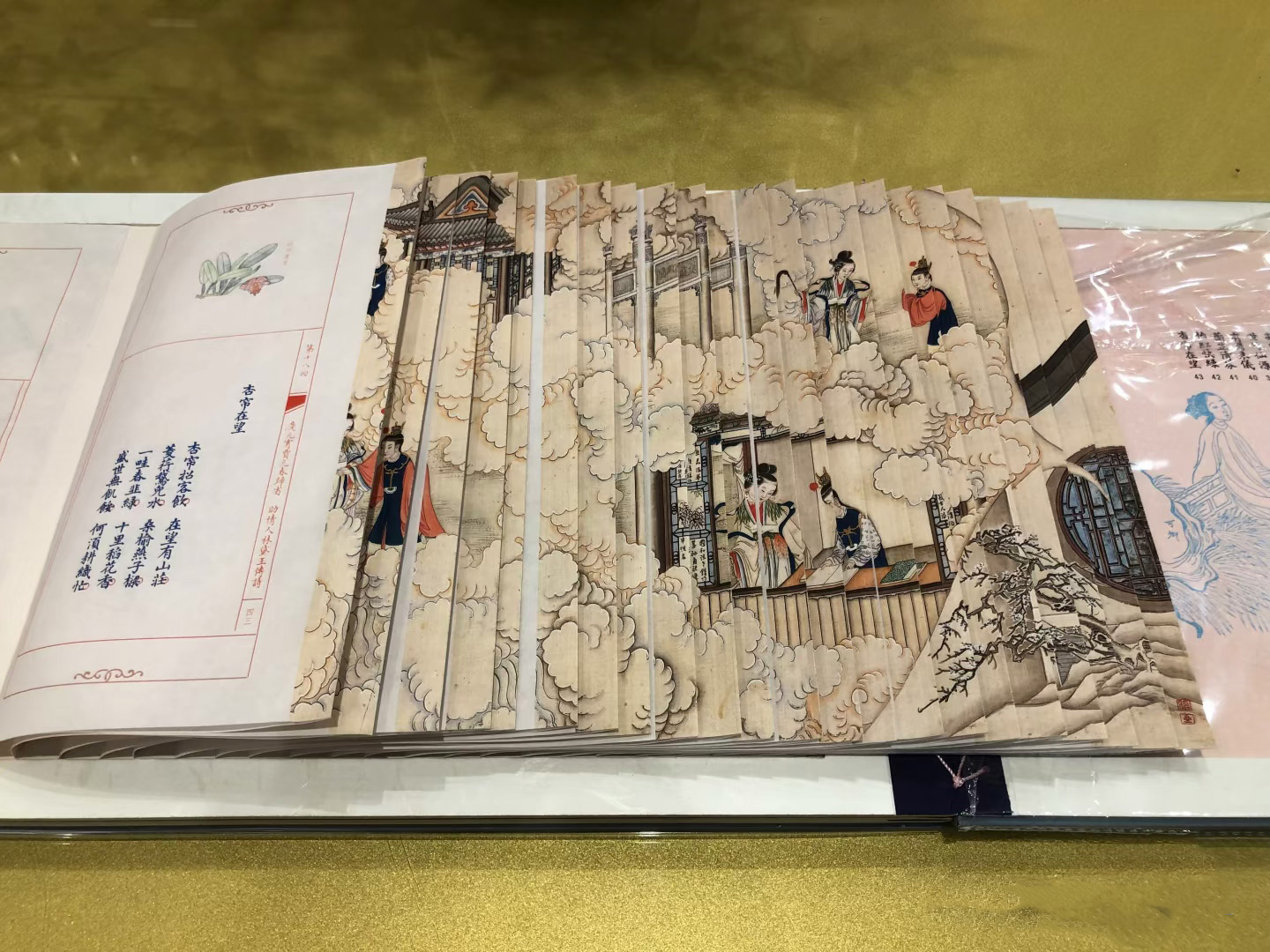
Zhang Xiaodong combined the techniques of dragon-scale binding and accordion folding to create a new form of binding known as "Jinglong Binding."

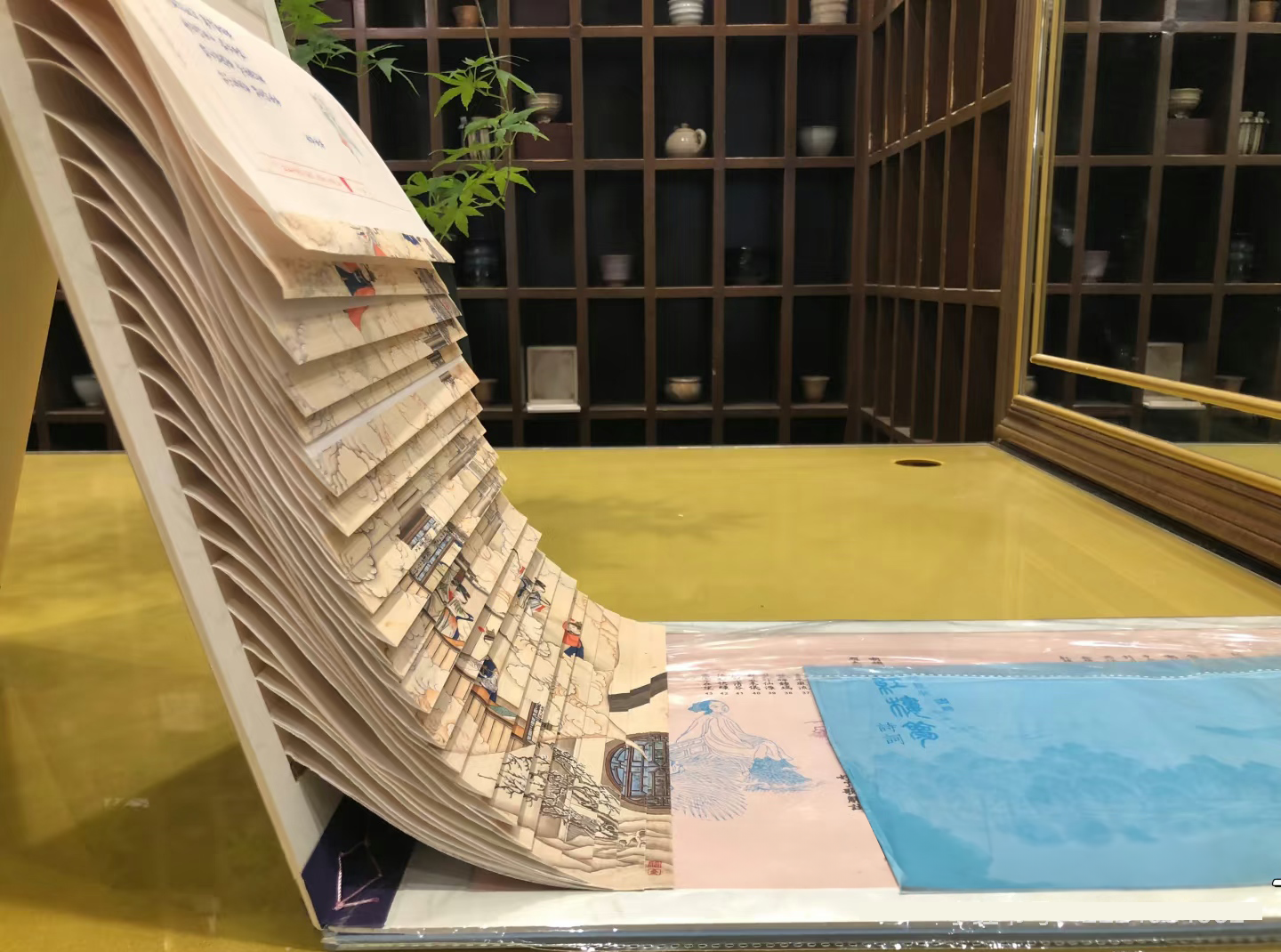
Zhang Xiaodong combined the techniques of dragon-scale binding and accordion folding to create a new form of binding known as "Jinglong Binding."

The cascading, layered arrangement evokes traditional Chinese aesthetic values, including rhythmic visual flow, continuity, and harmonious composition. The resemblance to dragon scales carries auspicious symbolic meaning in Chinese culture, where the dragon is associated with authority, vitality, and protection.

== Modern research and revival ==
Dragon scale binding is documented in conservation and research programs focusing on ancient book structures, particularly at the Palace Museum and the National Library of China.

== Examples ==
One of the most frequently cited surviving examples of dragon scale binding is the Tang-dynasty rhyme dictionary Kanmiu Buque Qieyun (《刊谬补缺切韵》), written by Wang Renxu and annotated by Changsun Neyan, with orthographic corrections by Pei Wuqi. The extant manuscript is preserved on thick xuan paper and consists of 24 leaves and 47 written sides. The first leaf is written on one side only, while the remaining leaves are written on both sides, mostly in 35 lines per page, increasing to 36 lines from the ninth leaf onward. Each leaf is ruled with red vertical columns and measures approximately 25.5 cm (10.0 in) in height and 47.8 cm (18.8 in).

Originally produced as separate leaves, the manuscript was mounted as a handscroll during the Xuanhe reign of the Song dynasty. The first leaf was mounted in full on the right end of the mounting paper, while the second leaf was attached only by its right edge. Each subsequent leaf was affixed in sequence, offset leftward by roughly 1 cm (0.39 in). This arrangement creates the characteristic cascading pattern associated with dragon scale binding.

Although resembling a standard handscroll in appearance, the reduced length and overlapping leaves make the manuscript easier to consult while also protecting the paper. This format represents a transitional stage between traditional scrolls and later multi-leaf book structures.

Additional visual documentation and high-resolution photographs of the manuscript are available on the official website of the Palace Museum.

A modern revival and artistic reinterpretation of dragon scale binding was documented by Garland Magazine, presenting contemporary handmade examples and discussing the transmission of the craft.

=== Gallery ===
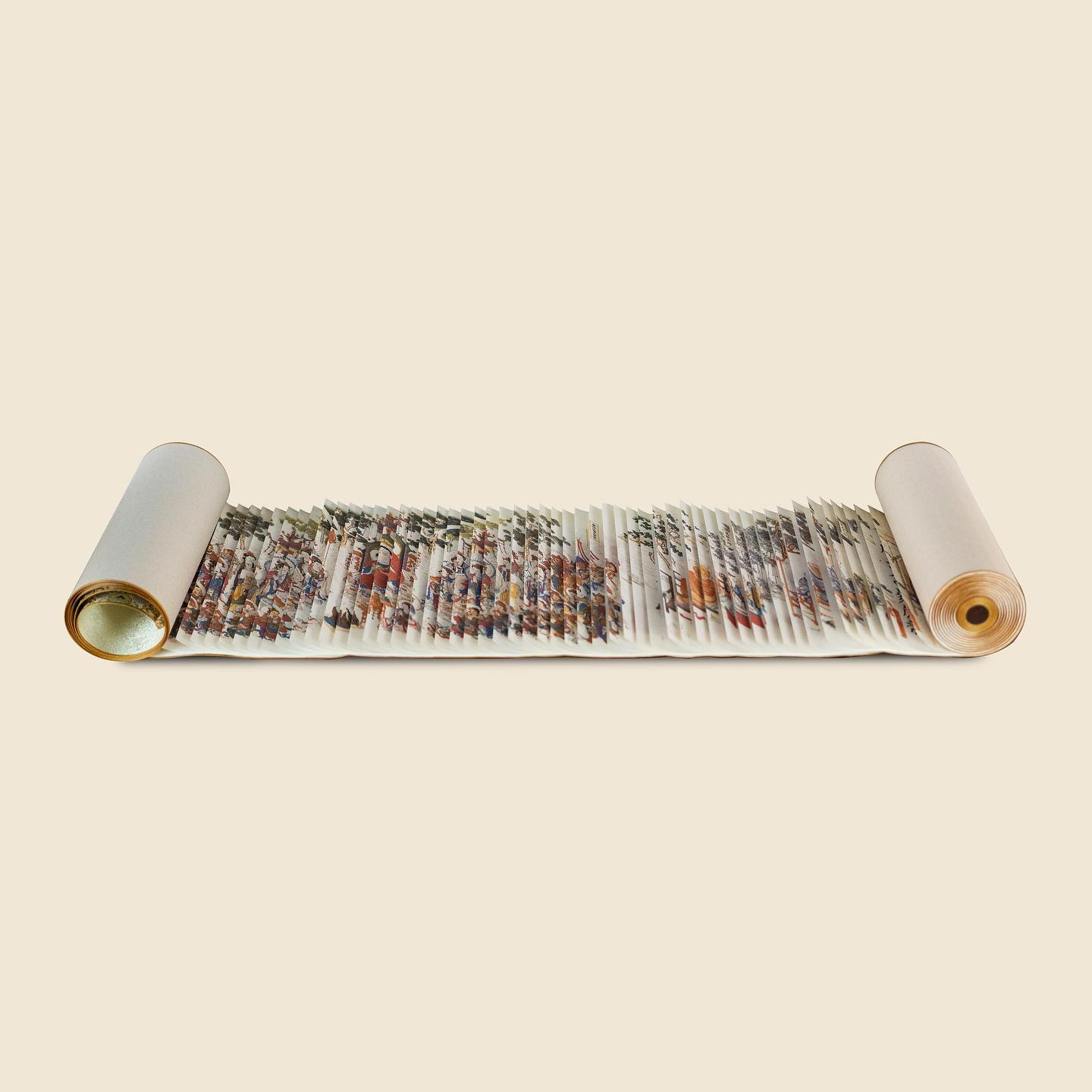
龙鳞装《三十二篆金刚般若波罗蜜经》 dragon scale set "Thirty-two Vajra Prajna Paramita Sutra"

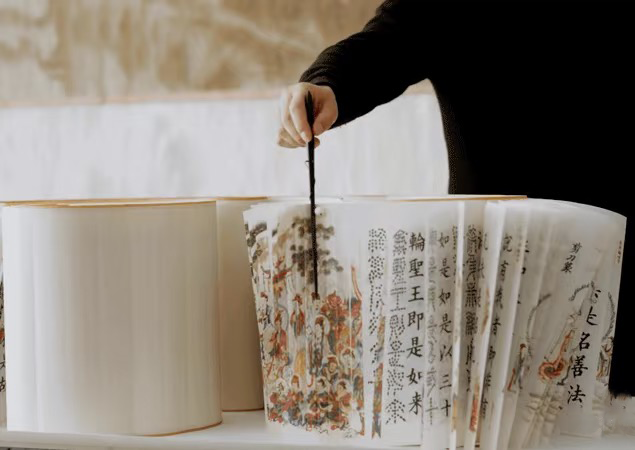
龙鳞装《三十二篆金刚般若波罗蜜经》 dragon scale set "Thirty-two Vajra Prajna Paramita Sutra"

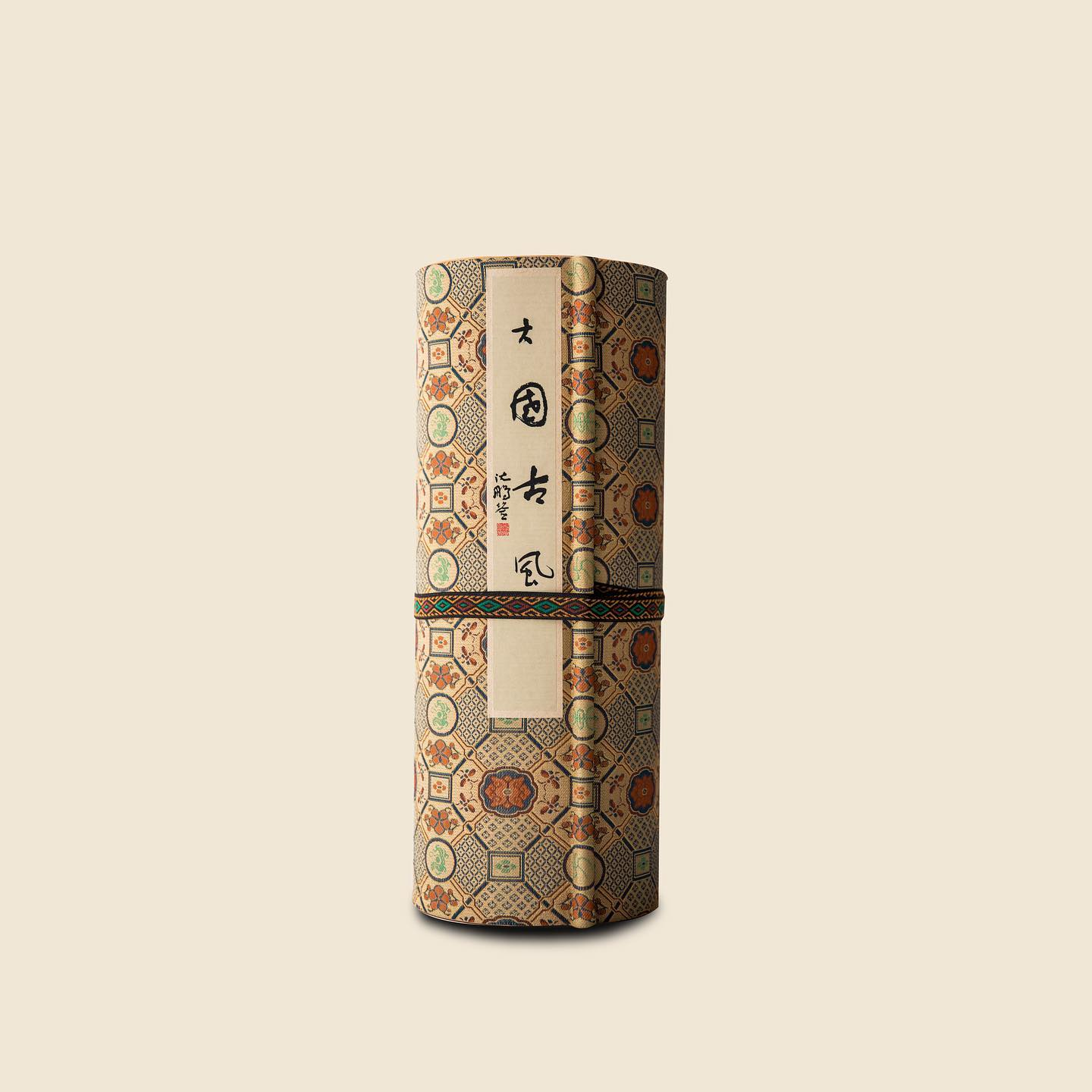
龙鳞装《大国古风》dragon scale set "Great Country Ancient Style"

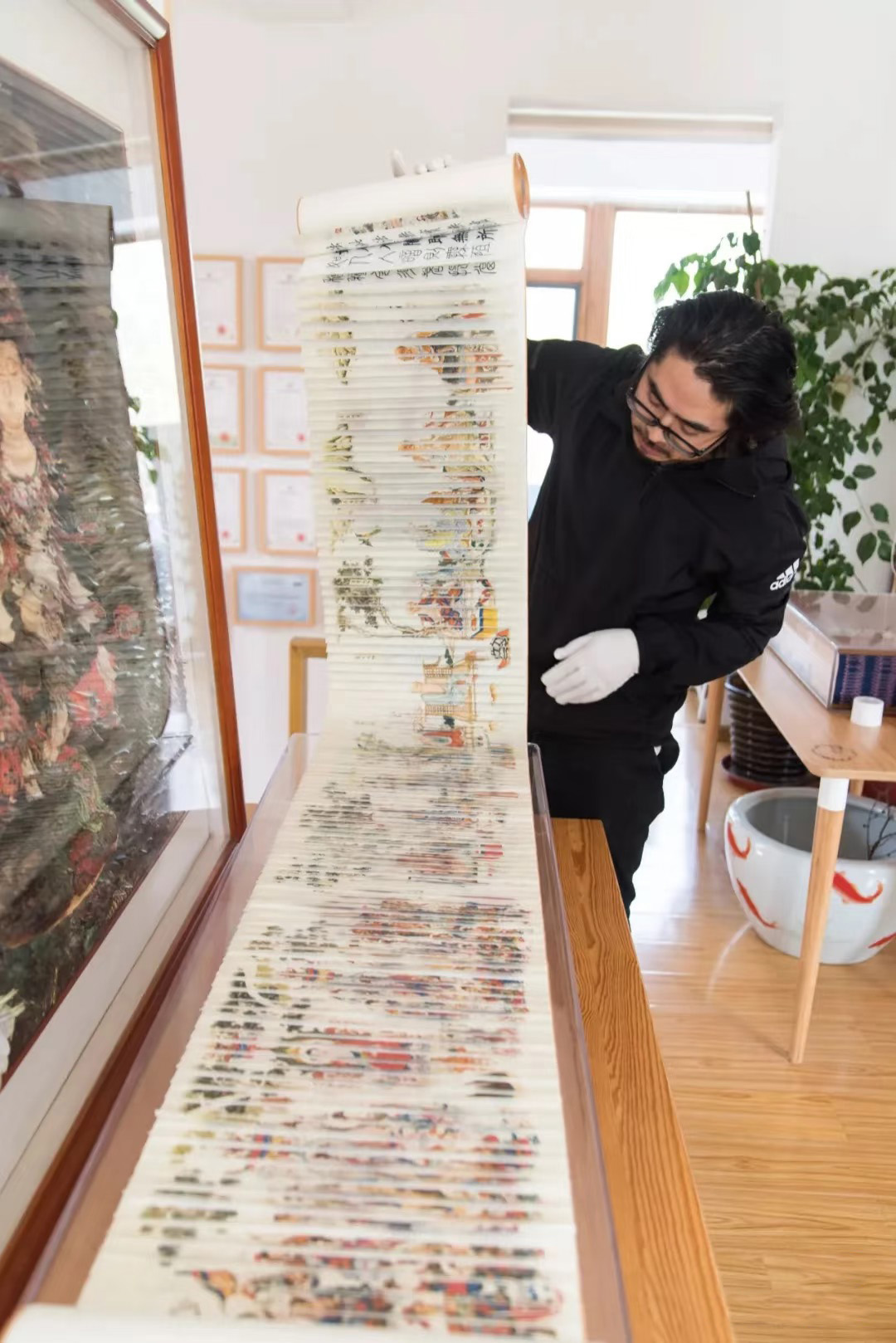
Zhang Xiaolong's dragon-scale binding work The Diamond Sutra in Thirty-Two Seals consists of 217 pages, measures a total length of 8 m (26 ft), and features detailed illustration.

A demonstration of dragon scale binding by Zhang Xiaodong, a contemporary inheritor of the craft (2020).

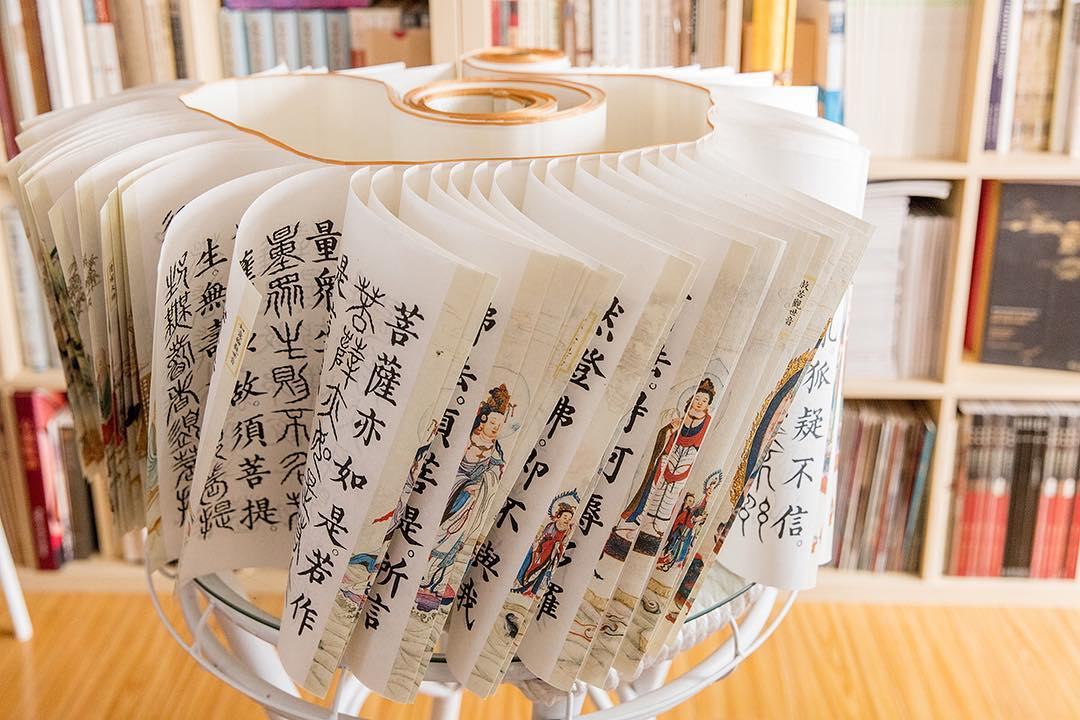
Dragon scale binding inheritor and his works

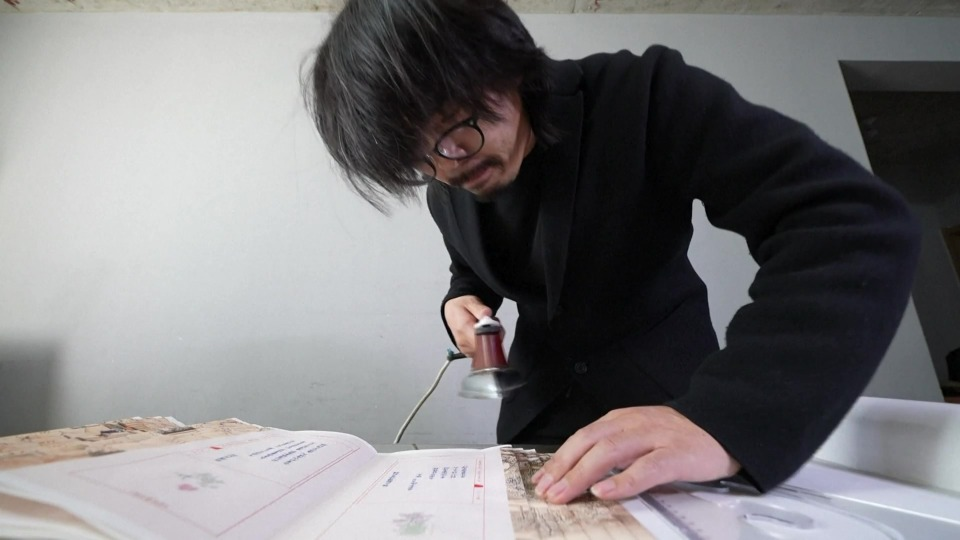
Creation of a dragon-scale bound book, which demands extremely high precision in design, cutting, and folding — with an allowable error of no more than 1 mm (0.039 in)

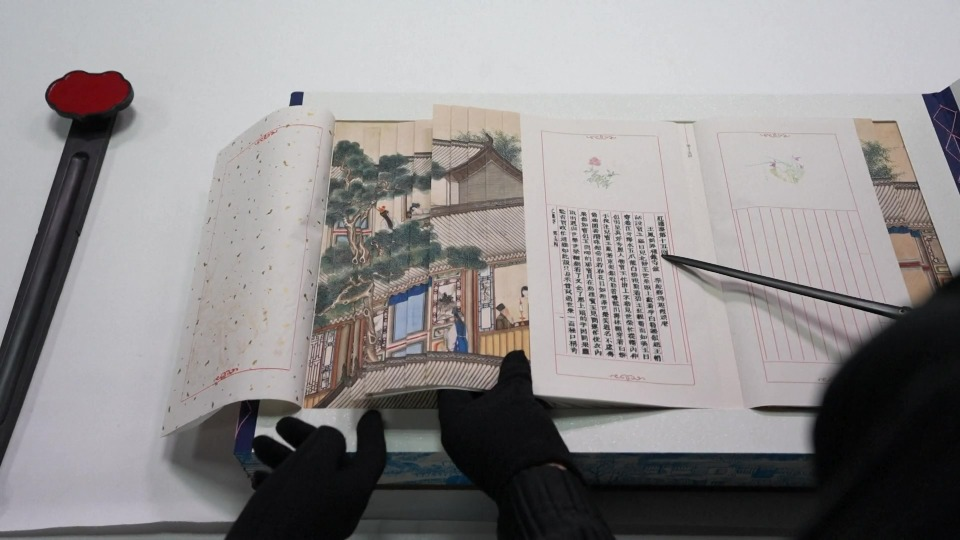
Zhang Xiaodong combined the techniques of dragon-scale binding and accordion folding to create a new form of binding known as Jinglong Binding.

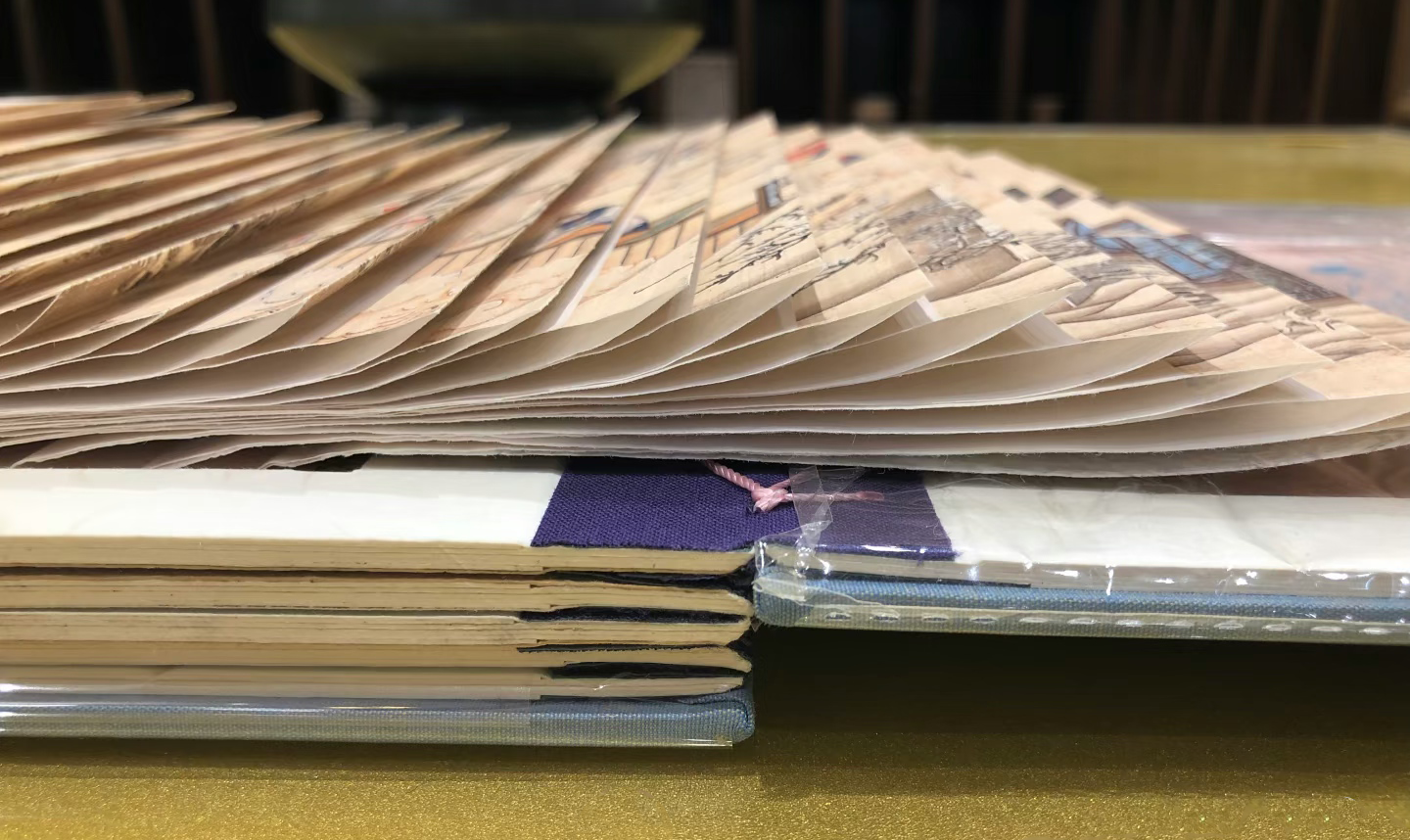
Edition_Dream of the Red Chamber, Zhang Xiaodong combined the techniques of dragon-scale binding and accordion folding to create a new form of binding known as Jinglong Binding.

== See also ==
- Chinese bookbinding
- History of printing in East Asia
