= RACE encoding =

System for encoding non-ASCII characters in ASCII

RACE encoding is a method for encoding foreign languages that use non-English characters (Chinese, Japanese, etc.) in ASCII characters for storage in domain name system servers. All names without non-English characters are unchanged. RACE codes are made up of digits, letters and dashes.

RACE encoding is part of the larger scheme of the Universal Character Set specifically the ISO/IEC 10646. The assignment of characters also coincides with Unicode.

Today, it is mostly abandoned in favor of punycode.

== Nomenclature ==
RACE is an acronym for its main purpose.

- R stands for Row-based
- A for ASCII
- C for Compatible
- E Encoding
