= TiE Rajasthan =

Indian nonprofit organization and think tank

TiE Rajasthan is a Rajasthan chapter of the non-profit community The Indus Entrepreneurs (TiE). Headquartered in Jaipur, TiE Rajasthan is aimed at fostering entrepreneurship through mentoring, networking, education, incubating, and funding new startups.

== History ==
In 2001, few entrepreneurs of IT Industry were called upon by Naren Bakshi, where he provided the guests with an introduction about TiE, the nonprofit organization dedicated to fostering entrepreneurship. They decided to formulate a group, and initiate activities aimed towards fulfilling the norms for an independent chapter of TiE. As a result, an ad-hoc working committee of 6 members was formed, titled as Rajasthan IT Entrepreneurs Group (RITEG) consisting of Ajay Data, Rajesh Moondra, Keshav Sharma, Hemant Gupta etc. All members committed Rs. 50000/- towards formation of the group. On 11 January 2002 TiE Rajasthan chapter was launched with a ceremony, attended by the then Chief Minister Ashok Gehlot, along with various other businesspeople from Silicon Valley like Kanwal Rekhi, Kailash Joshi, Vipin Shah, Naren Bakshi and Raj Desai among others.

== Presidents ==
- Yogendra Durlabhji - 2002-2004
- Ajay Data - 2004-2006
- Rajesh Moondra- 2006-2008
- Mahavir Sharma 2008-2010
- Atul Kapoor - 2010-2012
- Manuj Goel - 2012-2014
- Rajneesh Bhandari - 2014-2016
- Rajesh Moondra - 2016-2017
- Siddharth Agrawal - 2017- 2018
- Chirag Patel - 2019- 2020
- Ravi Modani 2021 - 2023
- Sheenu Jhawar 2023- current

== Programs ==
"TiECON", TiE's premier annual event, is held by TiE Rajasthan at regular intervals. Besides this, several other events are also organized and sponsored by TiE Rajasthan. Some of the notable events were:

- "Rajasthanan IT Destination" - An IT Seminar, jointly organised by NASSCOM and TiE Rajasthan on 17 August 2005 in Jaipur.
- "TiEcon Rajasthan 2009" - Held on 17 December 2009 at B.M. Birla Auditorium and Convention Centre, Statue Circle, Jaipur, the event was attended by a number of TiE Global Charter Members.
- "TiE Smashup 2014" - Held on 7 November 2014 in Jaipur, Smashup serves as a platform for startups to pitch their ideas, raise funds, and find new investors and partners.
- "TiEcon Rajasthan 2015" - Held on 25 July 2015 at Hotel ITC Rajputana, Jaipur, the event was attended and addressed by several notable entrepreneurs as well as political leaders. The Chief Guest of the event, Smt. Vasundhara Raje, the Chief Minister of Rajasthan, made an announcement about new policy aimed at strengthening the facilities for setting up of startups in Rajasthan.
