= James Seng =

Singaporean businessman

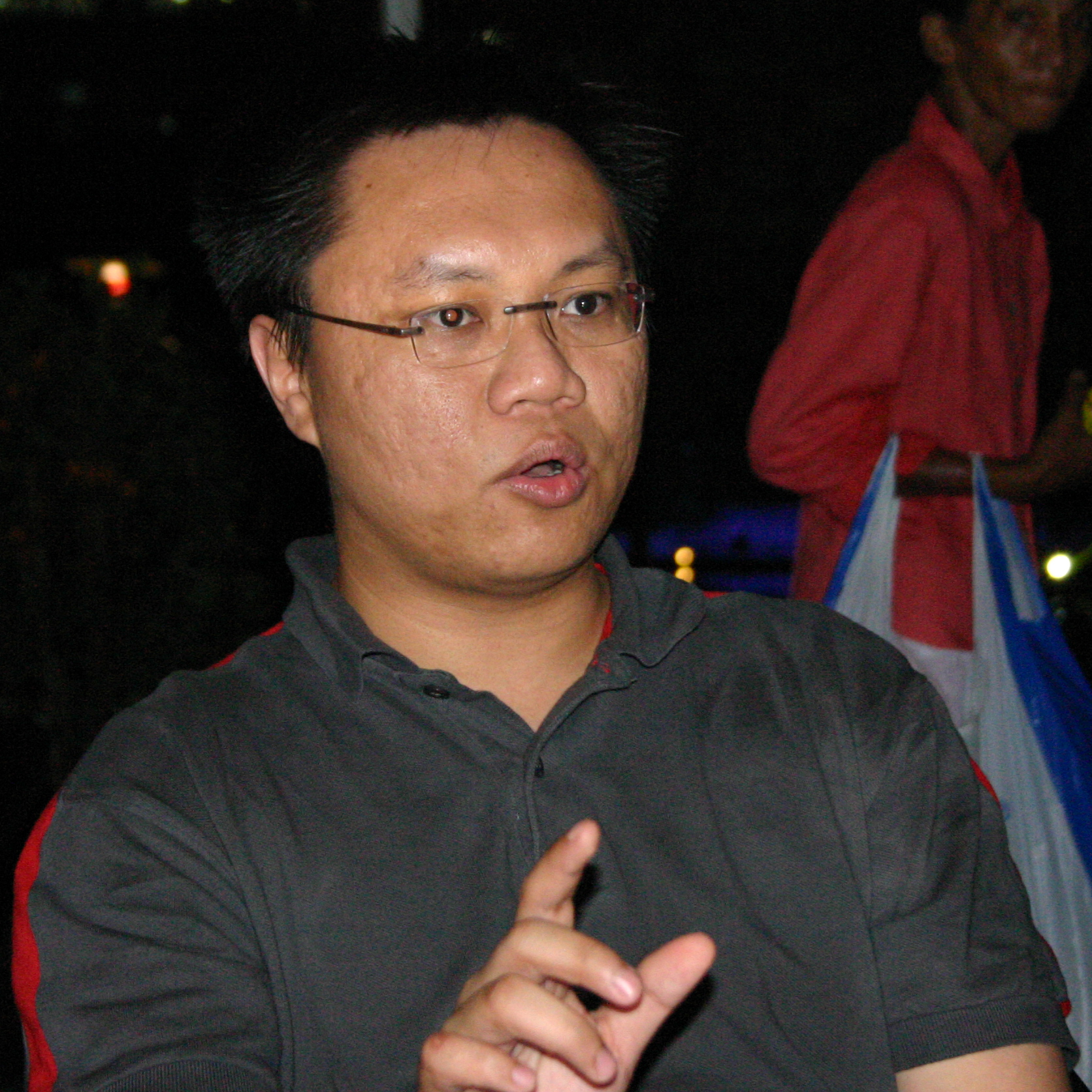
- James Seng in 2005

Chinese name
- Traditional Chinese: 莊振宏
- Simplified Chinese: 庄振宏
- Hanyu Pinyin: Zhuāng Zhènhóng

James Seng Ching Hong (Chinese: 庄振宏) is one of the Internet pioneers in Singapore and is recognized as an international expert in the Internet arena. He gave regular speeches at various forums on several Internet issues such as IDN, VoIP, IPv6, spam, OSS and Internet governance issues. Seng also participates actively in several standard organizations (such as ISO/IEC JTC1 and IETF) and also served on the board/committee of several Internet organizations.

== Biography ==
Seng started his career at TechNet, the first Internet service provider in Singapore, in 1993 when he was still a student at the National University of Singapore. In late 1998, he co-founded i-DNS.net and served as the company's Chief Technology Officer for 3 years. Under his guidance, the company expanded its presence worldwide.

Seng also developed several Internet software and services such as PObox (1995), a web-based email and forwarding service which has been licensed and commercialized by Singapore Press Holdings now known as PostOne and Singapore InfoMAP (1994), the official website for Singapore, which is currently operated by Infocomm Media Development Authority (IMDA).

Seng was formerly the co-chair of the Internationalized Domain Names Working Group that is responsible for the standardization of IDN.

Seng was formerly the Assistant Director of Enabler Technologies at the IMDA. His team is responsible for tracking emerging and disruptive technologies on the Internet, IP Telephony, open source software, information exchange, social software, antispam and other related fields.

In 2008, Seng started Thymos Capital LLP, an incubator based in Singapore focusing in helping young entrepreneurs.

Previously, Seng was the SVP of Technology of PPLive.

In 2017, Seng lobbied the office of US senator Ted Cruz to withdraw legislation to rename the street in front of the Embassy of China in Washington, D.C. to "Liu Xiaobo Plaza" in honor of Chinese human rights activist Liu Xiaobo.

Seng received the 2019 Communications Quality & Reliability (CQR) Chairman's Award from IEEE's Technical Committee.
