= Allen Zhang =

Chinese technology executive

Zhang Xiaolong (Chinese: 张小龙), also known as Allen Zhang, is a Chinese computer programmer and technology executive. He is known for leading the developments of WeChat and Foxmail. He is a senior executive vice president and president of Weixin Group at Tencent Holdings Limited. Zhang received B.S. and M.S degrees in telecommunication engineering from Huazhong University of Science and Technology in 1991 and 1994, respectively.
