= PHDCCI-Rajasthan =

Non-profit organisation of India

PHD Chamber of Commerce & Industry
- Founded: 1905
- Founder: PHDCCI Delhi Chapter
- Type: Chamber of commerce and industry
- Location(s): PHD Chamber of Commerce and Industry PHD House, 4/2 Siri Institutional Area, August Kranti Marg, New Delhi 110016
- Region served: New Delhi
- Services: Business Promotion, Networking, Policy Reforms, Expanding Business Opportunities, Advice to Govt. and businesses.
- Key people: Dr. Ranjeet Mehta (CEO and Secretary General)
- Website: https://www.phdcci.in/
- Formerly called: PHDCCI (Punjab Haryana & Delhi) Chamber

The PHD Chamber of Commerce and Industry (PHDCCI) is a trade and industry body of in India. It is a non-government, not-for-profit industry-led and industry-managed organisation, which claims to play a role in industrial development processes. PHDCCI has a membership of over 120 industries and entrepreneurs from the private and public sectors. It is authorised by the Government of India to issue certificates of origin for exports and to issue recommendations for visas. It is headquartered in the city of New Delhi.

== Membership ==
PHDCCI has a direct membership of 1,30,000 including industries/entrepreneurs from the private as well as public sectors.
