= Chinese Domain Name Consortium =

Chinese standard way to name

The Chinese Domain Name Consortium, created on 19 May 2000, is a collaboration among the People's Republic of China, the Republic of China (Taiwan), Hong Kong and Macau to come up with a standard way to create a domain name system for Chinese characters.

== See also ==
- Internationalized domain names
- Punycode
