= Internationalized domain name =

Type of internet domain name

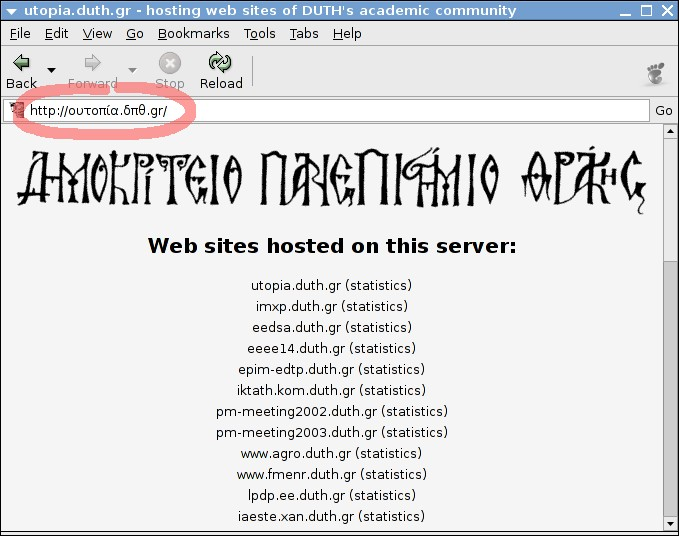
Example of Greek IDN with domain name in non-Latin alphabet: ουτοπία.δπθ.gr (Punycode is xn--kxae4bafwg.xn--pxaix.gr)

An internationalized domain name (IDN) is an Internet domain name that contains at least one label displayed in software applications, in whole or in part, in non-Latin script or alphabet (Note: Such as Arabic, Bengali, Chinese (Mandarin, simplified or traditional), Cyrillic (including Bulgarian, Russian, Serbian and Ukrainian), Devanagari, Greek, Hebrew, Hindi, Tamil or Thai.) or in the Latin alphabet-based characters with diacritics or ligatures. (Note: Such as French, German, Italian, Polish, Portuguese or Spanish.) These writing systems are encoded by computers in multibyte Unicode. Internationalized domain names are stored in the Domain Name System (DNS) as ASCII strings using Punycode transcription.

The DNS, which performs a lookup service to translate mostly user-friendly names into network addresses for locating Internet resources, is restricted in practice (Note: RFC 2181, Clarifications to the DNS Specification: section 11 explicitly allows any binary string. Non-ASCII encodings such as UTF-8 have indeed been (privately) used over DNS per RFC 6055. The system of internet domain name registration is, however, totally incapable of handling non-ASCII encodings, hence the restriction; see also RFC 5890 §§ 2.2, 2.3 on the format of names.) to the use of ASCII characters, a practical limitation that initially set the standard for acceptable domain names. The internationalization of domain names is a technical solution to translate names written in language-native scripts into an ASCII text representation that is compatible with the DNS. Internationalized domain names can only be used with applications that are specifically designed for such use; they require no changes in the infrastructure of the Internet.

IDN was originally proposed in December 1987 by Martin Dürst and implemented in 1990 by Tan Juay Kwang and Leong Kok Yong under the guidance of Tan Tin Wee. After much debate and many competing proposals, a system called Internationalizing Domain Names in Applications (IDNA) was adopted as a standard, and has been implemented in several top-level domains.

In IDNA, the term internationalized domain name means specifically any domain name consisting only of labels to which the IDNA ToASCII algorithm (see below) can be successfully applied. In March 2008, the IETF formed a new IDN working group to update the current IDNA protocol. In April 2008, Afilias together with UN-ESCWA and the Public Interest Registry (PIR) launched the Arabic Script in IDNs Working Group (ASIWG), which comprised experts in DNS, ccTLD operators, business, academia, as well as members of regional and international organizations, drawn from Egypt, Gambia, Iran, Jordan, Tunisia, Algeria, Sudan, Somalia, Djibouti, Kuwait, Pakistan, Saudi Arabia, Syria, UAE and Malaysia. Chaired by Afilias's Ram Mohan, ASIWG aimed to develop a unified IDN table for the Arabic script.

In October 2009, the Internet Corporation for Assigned Names and Numbers (ICANN) approved the creation of internationalized country code top-level domains (IDN ccTLDs) in the Internet that use the IDNA standard for native language scripts. In May 2010, the first IDN ccTLDs were installed in the DNS root zone.

== Internationalizing domain names in applications ==
Internationalizing Domain Names in Applications (IDNA) is a mechanism defined in 2003 for handling internationalized domain names containing non-ASCII characters.

Although the Domain Name System supports non-ASCII characters, applications such as e-mail and web browsers restrict the characters that can be used as domain names for purposes such as a hostname. Strictly speaking, it is the network protocols these applications use that have restrictions on the characters that can be used in domain names, not the applications that have these limitations or the DNS itself. To retain backward compatibility with the installed base, the IETF IDNA Working Group decided that internationalized domain names should be converted to a suitable ASCII-based form that could be handled by web browsers and other user applications. IDNA specifies how this conversion between names written in non-ASCII characters and their ASCII-based representation is performed.

An IDNA-enabled application can convert between the internationalized and ASCII representations of a domain name. It uses the ASCII form for DNS lookups but can present the internationalized form to users who presumably prefer to read and write domain names in non-ASCII scripts such as Arabic or Hiragana. Applications that do not support IDNA will not be able to handle domain names with non-ASCII characters, but will still be able to access such domains if given the (usually rather cryptic) ASCII equivalent.

== Guidelines for the implementation of internationalized domain names ==
A technical community working group to create the first IDN Guidelines was created in August 2002, consisting of Ram Mohan (Afilias), Hiro Hotta (JPRS), Pat Kane (Verisign), Cary Karp (.museum) and Tina Dam (ICANN). Version 1.0 of these Guidelines was published on 20 June 2003, coinciding with the launch of deployment of IDNs under the IETF's Proposed Standard reflected in RFCs 3490, 3491, and 3492. After the publication of the Guidelines, it was possible to register .jp domains using this system in July 2003 and .info domains in March 2004. Several other top-level domain registries started accepting registrations in 2004 and 2005. These Guidelines have been updated to respond to phishing concerns as well as to accommodate IDN variants. An ICANN working group focused on country-code domain names at the top level was formed in November 2007 and promoted jointly by the country code supporting organization and the Governmental Advisory Committee.

Additionally, ICANN supports the community-led Universal Acceptance Steering Group, founded by Ram Mohan in 2015, which seeks to promote the usability of IDNs and other new gTLDS in all applications, devices, and systems.

Mozilla 1.4, Netscape 7.1, and Opera 7.11 were among the first applications to support IDNA. A browser plugin is available for Internet Explorer 6 to provide IDN support. Internet Explorer 7.0 and Windows Vista's URL APIs provide native support for IDN.

=== ToASCII and ToUnicode ===
The conversions between ASCII and non-ASCII forms of a domain name are accomplished by a pair of algorithms called ToASCII and ToUnicode. These algorithms are not applied to the domain name as a whole, but rather to individual labels. For example, if the domain name is www.example.com, then the labels are www, example, and com. ToASCII or ToUnicode is applied to each of these three separately.

ToASCII leaves ASCII labels unchanged. It fails if the label is unsuitable for the Domain Name System. For labels containing at least one non-ASCII character, ToASCII applies the Nameprep algorithm. This converts the label to lowercase and performs other normalization. ToASCII then translates the result to ASCII, using Punycode. Finally, it prepends the four-character string "xn--". This four-character string is called the ASCII Compatible Encoding (ACE) prefix. It is used to distinguish labels encoded in Punycode from ordinary ASCII labels. The ToASCII algorithm can fail in several ways. For example, the final string could exceed the 63-character limit of a DNS label. A label for which ToASCII fails cannot be used in an internationalized domain name.

The function ToUnicode reverses the action of ToASCII, stripping off the ACE prefix and applying the Punycode decode algorithm. It does not reverse the Nameprep processing, since that is merely a normalization and is by nature irreversible. Unlike ToASCII, ToUnicode always succeeds, because it simply returns the original string if decoding fails. In particular, this means that ToUnicode does not affect a string that does not begin with the ACE prefix.

=== Example of IDNA encoding ===
IDNA encoding may be illustrated using the example domain Bücher.example. (German: Bücher, lit. 'books'.) This domain name has two labels, Bücher and example. The second label is pure ASCII and is left unchanged. The first label is processed by Nameprep to give bücher, and then converted to Punycode to result in bcher-kva. It is then prefixed with xn-- to produce xn--bcher-kva. The resulting name suitable for use in DNS records and queries is therefore xn--bcher-kva.example.

== Arabic Script IDN Working Group (ASIWG) ==
The Arab region, encompassing approximately 5% of the global population, exhibits a disproportionately low internet usage rate. As of the late 2000s, internet penetration within the Arab world stood at approximately 11% of the population, significantly below the global average of 21.9%. Despite this, the region experienced substantial internet usage growth between 2000 and 2008, registering a 1,426% increase, far exceeding the global average of 305.5% for the same period.

Factors influencing internet adoption in the Arab region include but are not limited to, linguistic accessibility. The availability of Domain Name System (DNS) services in Arabic script (Internationalized Domain Names, IDNs) is posited to have the potential to further stimulate internet usage. IDN implementation is anticipated to provide Arab internet users with the ability to register domains in their native language and script, thereby facilitating the development of localized applications and services. This advancement is expected to broaden access and enhance the relevance of internet resources for Arab-speaking populations.

In April 2008, Afilias together with UN-ESCWA and the Public Interest Registry (PIR) launched the Arabic Script in IDNs Working Group (ASIWG), which comprised experts in DNS, ccTLD operators, business, academia, as well as members of regional and international organizations, drawn from Egypt, Gambia, Iran, Jordan, Tunisia, Algeria, Sudan, Somalia, Djibouti, Kuwait, Pakistan, Saudi Arabia, Syria, UAE and Malaysia. Chaired by Afilias's Ram Mohan, ASIWG aimed to develop a unified IDN table for the Arabic script, the first of its kind.

The ASIWG's work led to the creation of the first Root Zone Generation Rules (RZ-LGR-1) and covered the Arabic script. It represented the first harmonized repertoire for the Arabic script, not including combining marks or code point sequences, leading to a simplified and technically sound outcome that resulted in the integration of Arabic script into the Root Zone of the Internet.

== Top-level domain implementation ==
In 2009, ICANN decided to implement a new class of top-level domains, assignable to countries and independent regions, similar to the rules for country code top-level domains. However, the domain names may be any desirable string of characters, symbols, or glyphs in the language-specific, non-Latin alphabet or script of the applicant's language, within certain guidelines to assure sufficient visual uniqueness.

The process of installing IDN country code domains began with a long period of testing in a set of subdomains in the test top-level domain. Eleven domains used language-native scripts or alphabets, such as "δοκιμή", meaning test in Greek.

These efforts culminated in the creation of the first internationalized country code top-level domains (IDN ccTLDs) for production use in 2010.

In the Domain Name System, these domains use an ASCII representation consisting of the prefix "xn--" followed by the Punycode translation of the Unicode representation of the language-specific alphabet or script glyphs. For example, the Cyrillic name of Russia's IDN ccTLD is "рф". In Punycode representation, this is "p1ai", and its DNS name is "xn--p1ai".

== Non-IDNA or non-ICANN registries that support non-ASCII domain names ==
Other registries support non-ASCII domain names. The company ThaiURL.com in Thailand supports ".com" registrations via its own IDN encoding, ThaiURL. However, since most modern browsers only recognize IDNA/Punycode IDNs, ThaiURL-encoded domains must be typed in or linked to in their encoded form, and they will be displayed thus in the address bar. This limits their usefulness; however, they are still valid and universally accessible domains.

Several registries support Punycode emoji characters as emoji domains.

== ASCII spoofing concerns ==
The use of Unicode in domain names makes it potentially easier to spoof websites as the visual representation of an IDN string in a web browser may make a spoof site appear indistinguishable from the legitimate site being spoofed, depending on the font used. For example, the Unicode character U+0430 – Cyrillic small letter a – can look identical to the Unicode character U+0061 (Latin small letter a), used in English. As a concrete example, using Cyrillic letters а, е, і, р (a; then "Ie"/"Ye" U+0435, looking essentially identical to Latin letter e; then U+0456, essentially identical to Latin letter i; and "Er" U+0440, essentially identical to Latin letter p), the URL wіkіреdіа.org is formed, which is virtually indistinguishable from the visual representation of the legitimate wikipedia.org (possibly depending on typefaces).

== Top-level domains accepting IDN registration ==
Many top-level domains have started to accept internationalized domain name registrations at the second or lower levels. Afilias (.INFO) offered the first gTLD IDN second-level registrations in 2004 in the German language.

DotAsia, the registrar for the TLD Asia, conducted a 70-day sunrise period starting May 11, 2011 for second-level domain registrations in the Chinese, Japanese and Korean scripts.

== Timeline ==
- December 1996: Martin Dürst's original Internet Draft proposing UTF-5 (the first example of what is known today as an ASCII-compatible encoding (ACE)) – UTF-5 was first defined at the University of Zürich
- March 1998: Early research on IDN at National University of Singapore (NUS), Center for Internet Research (formerly Internet Research and Development Unit – IRDU) led by Tan Tin Wee (T. W. Tan) (IDN Project team – Tan Juay Kwang and Leong Kok Yong) and subsequently continued under a team at Bioinformatrix Pte. Ltd. (BIX Pte. Ltd.) – an NUS spin-off company led by S. Subbiah.
- June 1998: Korean Language Domain Name System is developed by Kang, Hee-Seung at KAIST (Korea Advanced Institute of Science and Technology)
- July 1998:
  - Geneva INET'98 conference with a BoF discussion on iDNS and APNG General Meeting and Working Group meeting.
  - Asia Pacific Networking Group (APNG, now still in existence and distinct from a gathering known as APSTAR) iDNS Working Group formed.
- October 1998:
  - James Seng, a former student of Tan Tin Wee at Sheares Hall, NUS, and student researcher at Technet and IRDU, Computer Center, NUS, was recruited by CEO S. Subbiah to lead further IDN development at BIX Pte. Ltd.
  - iDNS Testbed launched by BIX Pte. Ltd. under the auspices of APNG with participation from CNNIC, JPNIC, KRNIC, TWNIC, THNIC, HKNIC, and SGNIC led by James Seng
  - Presentation of Report on IDN at Joint APNG-APTLD meeting, at APRICOT'99
- March 1999: Endorsement of the IDN Report at APNG General Meeting 1 March 1999.
- June 1999: Grant application by APNG jointly with the Centre for Internet Research (CIR), the National University of Singapore, to the International Development Research Center (IDRC), a Canadian Government funded international organization to work on IDN for IPv6. This APNG Project was funded under the Pan Asia R&D Grant administered on behalf of IDRC by the Canadian Committee on Occupational Health and Safety (CCOHS). Principal Investigator: Tan Tin Wee of National University of Singapore.
- July 1999:
  - Walid R. Tout (WALID Inc.) filed IDNA patent application number US1999000358043 "Method and system for internationalizing domain names". Published 30 January 2001.
  - Internet Draft on UTF5 by James Seng, Martin Dürst and Tan Tin Wee. Renewed 2000.
- August 1999: APTLD and APNG forms a working group to look into IDN issues chaired by Kilnam Chon.
- October 1999: BIX Pte. Ltd. and National University of Singapore together with New York Venture Capital investors, General Atlantic Partners, spun off the IDN effort into 2 new Singapore companies – i-DNS.net International Inc. and i-Email.net Pte. Ltd. that created the first commercial implementation of an IDN solution for both domain names and IDN email addresses respectively.
- November 1999: IETF IDN Birds-of-Feather in Washington was initiated by i-DNS.net at the request of IETF officials.
- December 1999: i-DNS.net International Pte. Ltd. launched the first commercial IDN. It was in Taiwan and in Chinese characters under the top-level IDN TLD ".gongsi" (meaning loosely ".com") with endorsement by the Minister of Communications of Taiwan and some major Taiwanese ISPs with reports of over 200 000 names sold in a week in Taiwan, Hong Kong, Singapore, Malaysia, China, Australia and USA.
- Late 1999: Kilnam Chon initiated Task Force on IDNS which led to the formation of MINC, the Multilingual Internet Names Consortium.
- January 2000:
  - IETF IDN Working Group formed chaired by James Seng and Marc Blanchet.
  - The second-ever commercial IDN launch was IDN TLDs in the Tamil Language, corresponding to .com, .net, .org, and .edu. These were launched in India with IT Ministry support by i-DNS.net International. These used non-standardized character sets, and were soon deprecated.
- February 2000: Multilingual Internet Names Consortium (MINC) Proposal BoF at IETF Adelaide.
- March 2000: APRICOT 2000 Multilingual DNS session.
- April 2000: WALID Inc. (with IDNA patent-pending application 6182148) started Registration & Resolving Multilingual Domain Names.
- May 2000: Interoperability Testing WG, MINC meeting. San Francisco, chaired by Bill Manning and Y. Yoneya, 12 May 2000.
- June 2000: Inaugural Launch of the Multilingual Internet Names Consortium (MINC) in Seoul to drive the collaborative roll-out of IDN starting from the Asia Pacific.
- July 2000:
  - Joint Engineering TaskForce (JET) was initiated in Yokohama to study technical issues led by JPNIC (K.Konishi)and TWNIC (Kenny Huang).
  - Official formation of CDNC (Chinese Domain Name Consortium) to resolve issues related to and to deploy Han Character domain names, founded by CNNIC, TWNIC, HKNIC and MONIC in May 2000.
- March 2001: ICANN Board IDN Working Group formed.
- July 2001:
  - Japanese Domain Name Association: JDNA Launch Ceremony (July 13, 2001) in Tokyo, Japan.
  - Urdu Internet Names System (July 28, 2001) in Islamabad, Pakistan, Organised Jointly by SDNP and MINC.
  - Presentation on IDN to the Committee Meeting of the Computer Science and Telecommunications Board, National Academies USA (JULY 11–13, 2001) at University of California School of Information Management and Systems, Berkeley, California.
- August 2001: MINC presentation and outreach at the Asia Pacific Advanced Network annual conference, Penang, Malaysia, 20 August 2001
- October 2001: Joint MINC-CDNC Meeting in Beijing 18–20 October 2001.
- November 2001: ICANN IDN Committee formed, Ram Mohan (Afilias) appointed as Charter Member and lead.
- December 2001: Joint ITU-WIPO Symposium on Multilingual Domain Names organized in association with MINC, 6–7 December 2001, International Conference Center, Geneva.
- January 2003:
  - ICANN IDN Guidelines Working Group formed with membership from Afilias (Ram Mohan), Verisign (Pat Kane), .museum (Cary Karp), JPRS (Hiro Hotta), members of leading gTLD and ccTLD registries.
  - Free implementation of stringprep, Punycode, and IDNA are released in GNU Libidn.
- March 2003: Publication of RFC 3454, RFC 3490, RFC 3491 and RFC 3492.
- June 2003: Publication of ICANN IDN guidelines for registries. Adopted by .cn, .info, .jp, .org, and .tw registries.
- May 2004: Publication of RFC 3743, Joint Engineering Team (JET) Guidelines for Internationalized Domain Names (IDN) Registration and Administration for Chinese, Japanese, and Korean.
- March 2005: First Study Group 17 of ITU-T meeting on Internationalized Domain Names.
- May 2005: .IN ccTLD (India) creates an expert IDN Working Group to create solutions for 22 official languages. Ram Mohan (Afilias) was appointed lead for technical implementation. C-DAC appointed a linguistic expert.
- April 2006: ITU Study Group 17 meeting in Korea gave final approval to the Question on Internationalized Domain Names.
- June 2006: Workshop on IDN at ICANN meeting at Marrakech, Morocco.
- November 2006: ICANN GNSO IDN Working Group created to discuss policy implications of IDN TLDs. Ram Mohan (Afilias) elected Chair of the IDN Working Group.
- December 2006: ICANN meeting in São Paulo discusses status of lab tests of IDNs within the root.
- January 2007: Tamil and Malayalam variant table work completed by Ram Mohan (Afilias) and India's C-DAC.
- March 2007: ICANN GNSO IDN Working Group completes work, Ram Mohan presents a report at ICANN Lisboa meeting.
- October 2007: Eleven IDNA top-level domains were added to the root nameservers in order to evaluate the use of IDNA at the top level of the DNS.
- January 2008: ICANN: Successful Evaluations of .test IDN TLDs.
- February 2008: IDN Workshop: IDNs in Indian Languages and Scripts, ICANN, DIT, Afilias, C-DAC, NIXI lead.
- April 2008:
  - IETF IDNAbis WG chaired by Vint Cerf continues the work to update IDNA.
  - Arabic Script IDN Working Group (ASIWG) founded by Ram Mohan (Afilias) and Alexa Raad (PIR) in Dubai.
- June 2008:
  - ICANN board votes to develop final fast-track implementation proposal for a limited number of IDN ccTLDS.
  - Arabic Script IDN Working Group (ASIWG) membership expands to Egypt, Iran, Kuwait, Pakistan, Saudi Arabia, Syria, UAE, Malaysia, UN ESCWA, APTLD, ISOC Africa, and invited experts Michael Everson and John Klensin.
- October 2008: ICANN seeks interest in IDN ccTLD fast-track process.
- September 2009: ICANN puts IDN ccTLD proposal on agenda for Seoul meeting in October 2009.
- October 2009: ICANN approves the registration of IDN names in the root of the DNS through the IDN ccTLD Fast-Track process at its meeting in Seoul, 26–30 October 2009.
- January 2010: ICANN announces that Egypt, the Russian Federation, Saudi Arabia, and the United Arab Emirates were the first countries to have passed the Fast-Track String Evaluation within the IDN ccTLD domain application process.
- May 2010: The first implementations go live. They are the ccTLDs in the Arabic alphabet for Egypt, Saudi Arabia, and the United Arab Emirates.
- August 2010-: The IETF publishes the updated "IDNA2008" specifications as RFC 5890–5894.
- December 2010: ICANN Board IDN Variants Working Group formed to oversee and track the IDN Variant Issues Project. Members of the working group are Ram Mohan (chair), Jonne Soininen, Suzanne Woolf, and Kuo-Wei Wu.
- February 2012: International email was standardized, utilizing IDN.

== See also ==
- Internationalized Resource Identifier
- List of Internet top-level domains
- Percent-encoding
