= Slug (disambiguation) =

A slug is a gastropod mollusk without a shell or with a very small internal shell.

Slug or slugs may also refer to:

== Objects ==
- Slug (coin), a counterfeit coin
- Slug (projectile), a solid ballistic projectile
- Slug (railroad), an accessory to a diesel-electric locomotive
- Slug or blank, a piece of bar stock ready to be machined into a finished part

== Publishing ==
- Slug (publishing), a short name given in newspaper editing to articles that are in production
- Slug (typesetting), a piece of spacing material used in typesetting to space paragraphs
- Slug (web publishing), a user- and SEO-friendly short text used in a URL to identify and describe a resource

== Arts, entertainment, and media ==
=== Fictional characters ===
- Slug (character), a villain in the Marvel Comics universe
- Lord Slug, the main antagonist of the fourth Dragon Ball Z movie

=== Films ===
- Slugs (1988 film), based on the Shaun Hutson novel
- Slugs (2004 film), German film

=== Music ===
==== Groups ====
- Slug (American band), an American noise rock band
- Slug (British band), a British art-rock band
- Slugs, the backing group of Doug and the Slugs, a Canadian pop music group

==== Songs ====
- "Slug" (song), a 1995 song by Passengers (U2 and Brian Eno)
- "Slug", a bonus song on the 1990 compilation album All the Stuff (And More) Volume Two by The Ramones

=== Other uses in arts, entertainment, and media ===
- SLUG Magazine, Salt Lake Under Ground magazine
- Slugs (novel), a 1982 novel by Shaun Hutson
- The Slug, a pop culture blog for the defunct web portal asap

== Science and technology ==
- Slug (unit), a unit of mass in the Imperial system
- Grex (biology), an aggregation of amoebae
- Slug, a nickname for the Linksys NSLU2
- Slugs (autopilot system), an open-source autopilot system oriented toward inexpensive autonomous aircraft
- SNAI2, a transcription factor in humans

== Sports ==
- Slug, another name for Chinese handball
- Slugs, a nickname of the Buffalo Sabres National Hockey League team - see List of ice hockey nicknames
- Slugs, a nickname for the UC Santa Cruz Banana Slugs, the sports teams of the University of California, Santa Cruz

== People ==
- Slug (rapper), an underground rapper best known as a member of the hip-hop group Atmosphere
- Ray Jordon (1937–2012), Australian cricketer, nicknamed Slug
- Steve Russell (computer scientist) (born 1937), American computer scientist, creator of the early video game Spacewar!, nicknamed Slug
- Beau Webster (born 1993), Australian cricketer, nicknamed Slug
- Casimir Witucki (1928–2015), American National Football League player, nicknamed Slug

== Other uses ==
- "Slug road", a colloquial name for the A957 roadway in eastern Scotland, UK
- Slug, a synonym for punch (combat)
- The Slug, a derogatory nickname for The Cloud, Auckland, a multi-purpose event venue in Auckland, New Zealand
- The Slug, another name for the Sunbeam 1000 hp land speed record car known as Mystery

== See also ==
- Slugger (disambiguation)
- Slugging, a carpooling
