= Chris Farrell =

Irish rugby union player (born 1993)

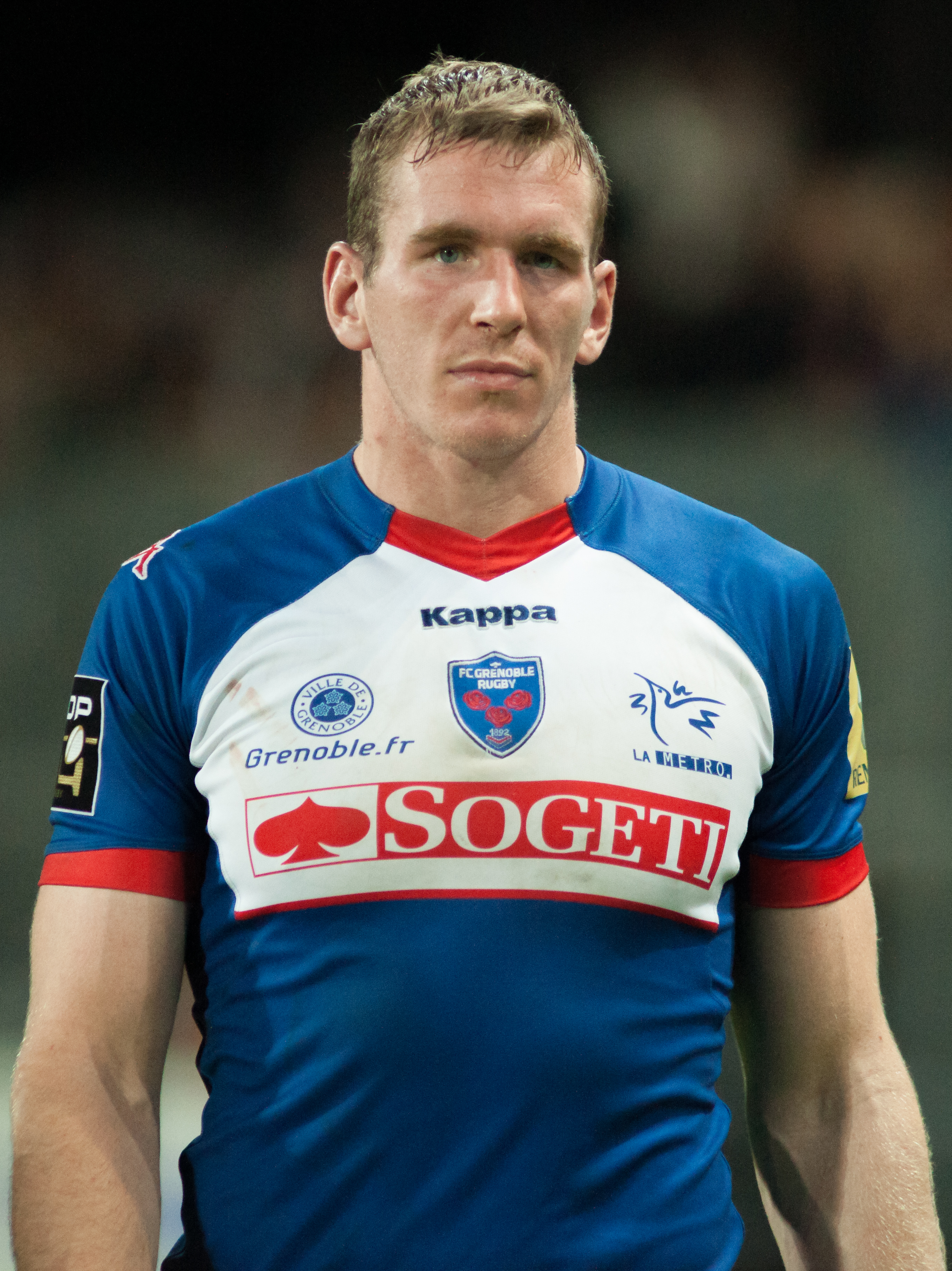
- Farrell playing for Grenoble
- Born: Christopher Robert Eric Farrell; 16 March 1993 (age 33) Fivemiletown, Northern Ireland
- Height: 1.91 m (6 ft 3 in)
- Weight: 110 kg (17 st; 240 lb)
- School: Fivemiletown College; Campbell College

Rugby union career
- Position: Centre
Amateur team(s)
Years	Team	Apps	(Points)
2004–2014	Clogher Valley RFC		
2017–2023	Young Munster		
Senior career
Years	Team	Apps	(Points)
2011–2014	Ulster	5	(0)
2014–2017	Grenoble	74	(50)
2017–2023	Munster	71	(45)
2023–2025	Oyonnax	7	(5)
- Correct as of 27 May 2023
International career
Years	Team	Apps	(Points)
2012	Ireland U20	9	(5)
2017–2021	Ireland	15	(5)
- Correct as of 3 July 2021

Christopher Robert Eric Farrell (born 16 March 1993) is a former Irish rugby union and former player for French Pro D2 club Oyonnax. He played as a centre. In 2024, he was given a four year sentence by a French court for failure to prevent a crime.

== Early life ==
Farrell grew up in Fivemiletown, a village in south Tyrone, Northern Ireland. His initial sporting passion was soccer and he played centre-half for a local team, before he started playing rugby at the age of 11 for Clogher Valley RFC in County Tyrone.

== Professional clubs ==
=== Ulster ===
In December 2011, Farrell, then aged 18, made his Ulster debut against Leinster.

=== Grenoble ===
At the beginning of the 2014–15 Top 14 season, Farrell joined French Top 14 side FC Grenoble, where Bernard Jackman, formerly of Connacht, Leinster and Ireland, was coach. Farrell made his debut against La Rochelle off the bench and made his first start against Oyonnax.

=== Munster ===
On 24 January 2017, it was announced that Farrell would be joining Irish province Munster on a two-year contract, beginning at the conclusion of the 2016–17 season. Farrell made his competitive debut for Munster on 1 September 2017, starting the provinces opening 2017–18 Pro14 fixture against Benetton in Irish Independent Park, Cork. Farrell scored his first try for Munster in their fixture against South African side Cheetahs on 9 September 2017, helping the province to a 51–18 win in Thomond Park. He was ruled out for 6–8 weeks following a knee injury sustained whilst playing for Ireland. He returned from the injury on 6 January 2018, starting in Munster's 39–13 win against Connacht.

A knee injury Farrell suffered while with the Ireland squad during the 2018 Six Nations required surgery, and subsequently ruled him out of the remainder of the 2017–18 season. He signed a three-year contract extension with Munster in October 2018. Farrell returned from the aforementioned knee injury on 25 November 2018, featuring off the bench in Munster's 2018–19 Pro14 round 9 fixture against Italian side Zebre. He scored two tries and earned the Man-of-the-Match in Munster's 44–14 win against Edinburgh on 30 November 2018.

Farrell won his 50th cap for Munster in their 35–14 away win against English club Wasps in round 1 of the 2021–22 Champions Cup on 12 December 2021, and signed a two-year contract extension with the province in January 2022, but was released from the contract early in March 2023.

=== Oyonnax ===
Farrell joined French Pro D2 club Oyonnax in March 2023. Having joined as a medical joker, Farrell secured a two-year contract extension with the club, and went on to help the club secure promotion to the Top 14 after they defeated Grenoble to win the 2022–23 Rugby Pro D2 season. Farrell was sacked by Oyonnax in January 2025 after his conviction for failure to prevent a crime.

== Ireland ==
Farrell earned his first senior international call-up in October 2017, being named in the Ireland squad for the 2017 Autumn Internationals. He made his first appearance for Ireland on 18 November 2017, starting against Fiji. Farrell also started in Ireland's win against Argentina, though he went off injured during the second-half. Farrell made his Six Nations debut on 24 February 2018, starting against Wales and earning the Man-of-the-Match award in Ireland's 37–27 win. However, a knee injury sustained during training ruled Farrell out of the remainder of the tournament.

Farrell was selected in the 31-man Ireland squad for the 2019 Rugby World Cup, having featured in the warm-up matches against Italy, and Wales. During the World Cup itself, Farrel was used as a replacement in Ireland's opening 27–3 win against Scotland, and he started in their shock 19–12 defeat against hosts Japan. When the 2020 Six Nations resumed in October 2020 following a delay due to the COVID-19 pandemic, Farrell featured as a replacement in Ireland's 35–27 defeat against France in their final fixture of the tournament.

With the usual format of end-of-year international tests not possible due to the COVID-19 pandemic, Ireland instead participated in the Autumn Nations Cup. Farrell started in the 32–9 opening win against Wales on 13 November, the 18–7 defeat against England on 21 November, and the 23–10 win against Georgia on 29 November, then featured off the bench in the 31–16 win against Scotland on 5 December, which secured a third-place finish for Ireland in the tournament. During the 2021 July rugby union tests, Farrell started in Ireland's 39–31 win against Japan, however, a head injury sustained during the game ruled Farrell out of Ireland's final test against the United States. A hip injury ruled Farrell out of the 2022 Ireland rugby union tour of New Zealand.

== Criminal conviction ==
On 13 December 2024, Farrell was charged with and convicted for failing to report a rape which was alleged to have been perpetrated by his colleagues when playing for FC Grenoble in 2017. Three players from the Top 14 team were charged with the violent gang rape of a woman after a Top 14 rugby match in Bordeaux in March 2017. Farrell was present where the rape occurred and owned a pair of crutches which were used on the victim during the attack. He was given a four-year sentence with two years suspended, however he was not sent to prison and instead was ordered to wear an electronic tag for two years and to remain in France. Oyonnax sacked him in January 2025 after his conviction.

== Statistics ==
=== International analysis by opposition ===
Against	Played	Won	Lost	Drawn	Tries	Points	% Won
Argentina	1	1	0	0	0	0	100
England	1	0	1	0	0	0	0
Fiji	1	1	0	0	0	0	100
France	1	0	1	0	0	0	0
Georgia	1	1	0	0	0	0	100
Italy	2	2	0	0	0	0	100
Japan	2	1	1	0	1	5	50
Scotland	3	3	0	0	0	0	100
Wales	3	3	0	0	0	0	100
Total	15	12	3	0	1	5	80

Correct as of 3 July 2021

== Honours ==
=== Munster ===
- URC
  - Winner (1): 2022–23

=== Oyonnax ===
- Pro D2
  - Winner (1): 2022–23

=== Ireland under-18s ===
- European Under-18 Rugby Union Championship
  - Winner (1): (2011)

=== Ireland ===
- Six Nations Championship:
  - Winner (1): 2018
- Grand Slam:
  - Winner (1): 2018
- Triple Crown:
  - Winner (1): 2018
