= Sluga =

- Hans Sluga (born 1939), a professor of philosophy
- Simon Sluga (born 1993), Croatian footballer
- Sluga, a 1989 Soviet film
- Alternative spelling of slugger, slang term for a powerful baseball batter
