= Digital object identifier =

ISO standard unique string identifier for a digital object

- Full name: Digital Object Identifier
- Acronym: DOI
- Organisation: International DOI Foundation
- Introduced: October 1997; 29 years ago
- Example: 10.1000/182
- Website: www.doi.org/the-identifier/what-is-a-doi/

A digital object identifier (DOI) is a persistent identifier, or persistent handle, used to uniquely identify various objects, standardized by the International Organization for Standardization (ISO). DOIs are an implementation of the Handle System; they also fit within the URI system (Uniform Resource Identifier). They are widely used to identify academic, professional, and government information, such as journal articles, research reports, data sets, and official publications.

A DOI aims to resolve to its target, the information object to which the DOI refers. This is achieved by binding the DOI to metadata about the object, such as a URL where the object is located. Thus, by being actionable and interoperable, a DOI differs from ISBNs or ISRCs which are identifiers only. The DOI system uses the indecs Content Model to represent metadata.

The DOI for a document remains fixed over the lifetime of the document, whereas its location and other metadata may change. Referring to an online document by its DOI should provide a more stable link than directly using its URL, but if its URL changes, the publisher must update the metadata for the DOI to maintain the link to the URL. It is the publisher's responsibility to update the DOI database. If they fail to do so, the DOI resolves to a dead link, leaving the DOI useless.

The developer and administrator of the DOI system is the International DOI Foundation (IDF), which introduced it in 2000. Organizations that meet the contractual obligations of the DOI system and are willing to pay to become a member of the system can assign DOIs. The DOI system is implemented through a federation of registration agencies coordinated by the IDF. The cumulative number of DOIs has increased exponentially over time, from 50 million registrations in 2011 to 391 million in 2025. The rate of registering organizations ("members") has also increased over time from 4,000 in 2011 to 9,500 in 2013, but the federated nature of the system means it is not immediately clear how many members there are in total today. Fake registries have even appeared.

== Nomenclature and syntax ==
A DOI is a type of Handle System handle, which takes the form of a character string divided into two parts, a prefix and a suffix, separated by a slash.

prefix/suffix

The prefix identifies the registrant of the identifier and the suffix is chosen by the registrant and identifies the specific object associated with that DOI. Most legal Unicode characters are allowed in these strings, which are interpreted in a case-insensitive manner. The prefix usually takes the form 10.NNNN, where NNNN is a number greater than or equal to 1000, whose limit depends only on the total number of registrants. The prefix may be further subdivided with periods, like 10.NNNN.N.

For example, in the DOI name 10.1000/182, the prefix is 10.1000 and the suffix is 182. The "10" part of the prefix distinguishes the handle as part of the DOI namespace, as opposed to some other Handle System namespace, (Note: Other registries are identified by other strings at the start of the prefix.) and the characters 1000 in the prefix identify the registrant; in this case the registrant is the International DOI Foundation itself. 182 is the suffix, or item ID, identifying a single object (in this case, the latest version of the DOI Handbook).

DOI names can identify creative works (such as texts, images, audio or video items, and software) in both electronic and physical forms, performances, and abstract works such as licenses, parties to a transaction, etc.

The names can refer to objects at varying levels of detail: thus DOI names can identify a journal, an individual issue of a journal, an individual article in the journal, or a single table in that article. The choice of level of detail is left to the assigner, but in the DOI system it must be declared as part of the metadata that is associated with a DOI name, using a data dictionary based on the indecs Content Model.

=== Display ===
The official DOI Handbook explicitly states that DOIs should be displayed on screens and in print in the format doi:10.1000/182.

Contrary to the DOI Handbook, Crossref, a major DOI registration agency, recommends displaying a URL (for example, https://doi.org/10.1000/182) instead of the officially specified format. The DOI Foundation guarantees these URLs to be persistent—i.e. such URLs are PURLs, providing the location of a name resolver which will redirect HTTP requests to the correct online location of the linked item.

The Crossref recommendation is primarily based on the assumption that the DOI is being displayed without being hyperlinked to its appropriate URL—the argument being that without the hyperlink it is not as easy to copy-and-paste the full URL to actually bring up the page for the DOI, thus the entire URL should be displayed, allowing people viewing the page containing the DOI to copy-and-paste the URL, by hand, into a new window/tab in their browser in order to go to the appropriate page for the document the DOI represents.

Currently, major citation styles differ in their guidelines for formatting the DOI, with AMA style using the DOI Handbook format and APA, MLA and Chicago Style using the full URL format.

== Content ==
Major content of the DOI system currently includes:

- Scholarly materials (journal articles, books, ebooks, etc.) through Crossref, a consortium of around 3,000 publishers; Airiti, a leading provider of Chinese and Taiwanese electronic academic journals; and the Japan Link Center (JaLC) an organization providing link management and DOI assignment for electronic academic journals in Japanese.
- Research datasets through DataCite, a consortium of leading research libraries, technical information providers, and scientific data centers;
- European Union official publications through the EU publications office;
- The Chinese National Knowledge Infrastructure project at Tsinghua University and the Institute of Scientific and Technical Information of China (ISTIC), two initiatives sponsored by the Chinese government.
- Permanent global identifiers for both commercial and non-commercial audio/visual content titles, edits, and manifestations through the Entertainment ID Registry, commonly known as EIDR.

In the Organisation for Economic Co-operation and Development's publication service OECD iLibrary, each table or graph in an OECD publication is shown with a DOI name that leads to an Excel file of data underlying the tables and graphs. Further development of such services is planned.

Other registries include Crossref and the multilingual European DOI Registration Agency (mEDRA). Since 2015, RFCs can be referenced as doi:10.17487/rfc....

== Features and benefits ==
The IDF designed the DOI system to provide persistent identification. Each DOI name permanently and clearly identifies the object it belongs to (although when the publisher of a journal changes, sometimes all the DOIs will be changed, with the old DOIs no longer working). It also associates metadata with objects, allowing it to provide users with relevant pieces of information about the objects and their relationships. Included as part of this metadata are network actions that allow DOI names to be resolved to web locations where the objects they describe can be found. To achieve its goals, the DOI system combines the Handle System and the indecs Content Model with a social infrastructure.

The Handle System ensures that the DOI name for an object is not based on any changeable attributes of the object such as its physical location or ownership, that the attributes of the object are encoded in its metadata rather than in its DOI name, and that no two objects are assigned the same DOI name. Because DOI names are short character strings, they are human-readable, may be copied and pasted as text, and fit into the URI specification. The DOI name-resolution mechanism acts behind the scenes, so that users communicate with it in the same way as with any other web service; it is built on open architectures, incorporates trust mechanisms, and is engineered to operate reliably and flexibly so that it can be adapted to changing demands and new applications of the DOI system. DOI name-resolution may be used with OpenURL to select the most appropriate among multiple locations for a given object, according to the location of the user making the request. However, despite this ability, the DOI system has drawn criticism from librarians for directing users to non-free copies of documents, that would have been available for no additional fee from alternative locations.

The indecs Content Model as used within the DOI system associates metadata with objects. A small kernel of common metadata is shared by all DOI names and can be optionally extended with other relevant data, which may be public or restricted. Registrants may update the metadata for their DOI names at any time, such as when publication information changes or when an object moves to a different URL.

The International DOI Foundation (IDF) oversees the integration of these technologies and operation of the system through a technical and social infrastructure. The social infrastructure of a federation of independent registration agencies offering DOI services was modelled on existing successful federated deployments of identifiers such as GS1 and ISBN.

== Comparison with other identifier schemes ==
A DOI name differs from commonly used Internet pointers to material, such as the Uniform Resource Locator (URL), in that it identifies an object itself as a first-class entity, rather than the specific place where the object is located at a certain time. It implements the Uniform Resource Identifier (Uniform Resource Name) concept and adds to it a data model and social infrastructure.

A DOI name also differs from standard identifier registries such as the ISBN, ISRC, etc. The purpose of an identifier registry is to manage a given collection of identifiers, whereas the primary purpose of the DOI system is to make a collection of identifiers actionable and interoperable, where that collection can include identifiers from many other controlled collections.

The DOI system offers persistent, semantically interoperable resolution to related current data and is best suited to material that will be used in services outside the direct control of the issuing assigner (e.g., public citation or managing content of value). It uses a managed registry (providing both social and technical infrastructure). It does not assume any specific business model for the provision of identifiers or services and enables other existing services to link to it in defined ways. Several approaches for making identifiers persistent have been proposed.

The comparison of persistent identifier approaches is difficult because they are not all doing the same thing. Imprecisely referring to a set of schemes as "identifiers" does not mean that they can be compared easily. Other "identifier systems" may be enabling technologies with low barriers to entry, providing an easy-to-use labeling mechanism that allows anyone to set up a new instance (examples include Persistent Uniform Resource Locator (PURL), URLs, Globally Unique Identifiers (GUIDs), etc.), but may lack some of the functionality of a registry-controlled scheme and will usually lack accompanying metadata in a controlled scheme.

The DOI system does not have this approach and should not be compared directly to such identifier schemes. Various applications using such enabling technologies with added features have been devised that meet some of the features offered by the DOI system for specific sectors (e.g., ARK).

A DOI name does not depend on the object's location and, in this way, is similar to a Uniform Resource Name (URN) or PURL but differs from an ordinary URL. URLs are often used as substitute identifiers for documents on the Internet although the same document at two different locations has two URLs. By contrast, persistent identifiers such as DOI names identify objects as first class entities: two instances of the same object would have the same DOI name. In May, 2024, an Internet Draft was introduced to register the "doi" scheme. Many experts were not aware of this draft, and the latest draft has currently expired.

== Resolution ==
To resolve a DOI name, it may be input to a DOI resolver, such as one at the official website https://doi.org/.

DOI name resolution is provided through the Handle System, which is an infrastructure developed and operated by CNRI (Corporation for National Research Initiatives), and is freely available to any user encountering a DOI name. Resolution redirects the user from a DOI name to one or more pieces of typed data: URLs representing instances of the object, services such as e-mail, or one or more items of metadata. To the Handle System, a DOI name is a handle, and so has a set of values assigned to it and may be thought of as a record that consists of a group of fields. Each handle value must have a data type specified in its <type> field, which defines the syntax and semantics of its data. While a DOI persistently and uniquely identifies the object to which it is assigned, DOI resolution may not be persistent, due to technical and administrative issues.

Another approach, which avoids typing or copying and pasting into a resolver is to include the DOI in a document as a URL which uses the resolver as an HTTP proxy, such as https://doi.org/ (preferred) or http://dx.doi.org/, both of which support HTTPS. For example, the DOI 10.1000/182 can be included in a reference or hyperlink as https://doi.org/10.1000/182. This approach allows users to click on the DOI as a normal hyperlink. Indeed, as previously mentioned, this is how Crossref recommends that DOIs always be represented (preferring HTTPS over HTTP), so that if they are cut-and-pasted into other documents, emails, etc., they will be actionable.

A consequence of the fact that DOIs depend entirely on CNRI's Handle System infrastructure (whereby CNRI operates the global root servers and wrote the protocol) is that the proxy services DOI.org/<#> and hdl.handle.net/<#> are interoperable. For example, the following URIs resolve to the same publication:
https://doi.org/10.1016/S0021-9258(19)52451-6
https://hdl.handle.net/10.1016/S0021-9258(19)52451-6

There are other DOI resolvers and HTTP Proxies apart from NCRI's Handle System. At the beginning of the year 2016, a new class of alternative DOI resolvers was started by http://doai.io/ (now discontinued). This service was unusual in that it tried to find a non-paywalled (often author archived) version of a title and redirected the user to that instead of the publisher's version. Since then, other open-access favoring DOI resolvers have been created, notably https://oadoi.org/ in October 2016 (rebranded in 2017 as https://unpaywall.org/). While traditional DOI resolvers solely rely on the Handle System, alternative DOI resolvers first consult multiple Open Access resources such as institutional libraries with the Open Archives Initiative Protocol for Metadata Harvesting (OAI-PMH), or indexing services based in OAI-PMH, such as BASE (Bielefeld Academic Search Engine).

An alternative to HTTP proxies is to use one of a number of add-ons and plug-ins for browsers, thereby avoiding the conversion of the DOIs to URLs, which depend on domain names and may be subject to change, while still allowing the DOI to be treated as a normal hyperlink. A disadvantage of this approach for publishers is that, at least at present, most users will be encountering the DOIs in a browser, mail reader, or other software which does not have one of these plug-ins installed.

== IDF organizational structure ==
International DOI Foundation
- Type: 501(c)(6) organization
- Founded: October 10, 1997; 29 years ago

The International DOI Foundation (IDF), a non-profit organization created in 1997, is the governance body of the DOI system. It safeguards all intellectual property rights relating to the DOI system, manages common operational features, and supports the development and promotion of the DOI system. The IDF ensures that any improvements made to the DOI system (including creation, maintenance, registration, resolution and policymaking of DOI names) are available to any DOI registrant. It also prevents third parties from imposing additional licensing requirements beyond those of the IDF on users of the DOI system.

The IDF is controlled by a Board elected by the members of the Foundation, with an appointed Managing Agent who is responsible for co-ordinating and planning its activities. Membership is open to all organizations with an interest in electronic publishing and related enabling technologies. The IDF holds annual open meetings on the topics of DOI and related issues.

Registration agencies, appointed by the IDF, provide services to DOI registrants: they allocate DOI prefixes, register DOI names, and provide the necessary infrastructure to allow registrants to declare and maintain metadata and state data. Registration agencies are also expected to actively promote the widespread adoption of the DOI system, to cooperate with the IDF in the development of the DOI system as a whole, and to provide services on behalf of their specific user community. A list of current RAs is maintained by the International DOI Foundation. The IDF is recognized as one of the federated registrars for the Handle System by the DONA Foundation (of which the IDF is a board member), and is responsible for assigning Handle System prefixes under the top-level 10 prefix.

Registration agencies generally charge a fee to assign a new DOI name; parts of these fees are used to support the IDF. The DOI system overall, through the IDF, operates on a not-for-profit cost recovery basis.

== Standardization ==
The DOI system is an international standard developed by the International Organization for Standardization in its technical committee on identification and description, TC46/SC9. The Draft International Standard ISO/DIS 26324, Information and documentation – Digital Object Identifier System met the ISO requirements for approval. The relevant ISO Working Group later submitted an edited version to ISO for distribution as an FDIS (Final Draft International Standard) ballot, which was approved by 100% of those voting in a ballot closing on 15 November 2010. The final standard was published on 23 April 2012.

DOI is a registered URI under the info URI scheme specified by IETF RFC 4452. info:doi/ is the infoURI Namespace of Digital Object Identifiers.

The DOI syntax is a NISO standard, first standardized in 2000, ANSI/NISO Z39.84-2005 Syntax for the Digital Object Identifier.

The maintainers of the DOI system have registered a DOI namespace for URNs.

== See also ==
- arXiv
- Bibcode
- DataCite
- Digital identity
- Metadata standard
- Object identifier
- ORCID
- Permalink
- PMID
- Publisher Item Identifier (PII)
- Scientific literature
- Universally unique identifier (UUID)
