= URC =

URC may stand for:

== Church ==
- United Reformed Church, a Christian denomination in Great Britain
- United Reformed Churches in North America

== Companies ==
- Uganda Railways Corporation, operating railways in Uganda
- United Refining Company, an oil company in Pennsylvania, United States
- Urban Regeneration Company, a type of company in the United Kingdom
- Universal Robina Corporation, a Filipino food and beverage company

== Rugby ==
- Undeb Rygbi Cymru, the Welsh-language name for the Welsh Rugby Union
- Under-19s Rugby Championship, an Australian tournament for junior men's teams
- United Rugby Championship, for rugby union clubs in Ireland, Italy, Scotland, South Africa, and Wales
- Unión de Rugby de Cuyo, governing body of rugby union in Mendoza, Argentina

== Science and technology ==
- Universal remote or "universal remote control"
- Universal Remote Console, defined by ISO/IEC 24752
- Uniform Resource Characteristics, a computing term
- Universal rotation curve, a unified description of galactic rotation curves
- University Rover Challenge, an annual competition for college students, by the Mars Society
- Unsolicited Result Code in Hayes AT Command

== People ==
- Rudolf Urc, Slovak film director and dramaturg

== Other ==
- Union Revolutionary Council, the supreme governing body of Burma from 1962 to 1974
- Ürümqi Diwopu International Airport, China (IATA code)
- Utility regulatory commission
- Universal Races Congress, an international meeting on racial understanding in 1911 in London
- Ulster Reform Club, a business and private members club in Belfast, Northern Ireland
