= Uniform Resource Name =

Uniform Resource Identifier that uses the urn scheme

A Uniform Resource Name (URN) is a Uniform Resource Identifier (URI) that uses the urn scheme. URNs are globally unique persistent identifiers assigned within defined namespaces so they will be available for a long period of time, even after the resource which they identify ceases to exist or becomes unavailable. URNs cannot be used to directly locate an item and need not be resolvable, as they are simply templates that another parser may use to find an item.

== URIs, URNs, and URLs ==
URNs were originally conceived to be part of a three-part information architecture for the Internet, along with Uniform Resource Locators (URLs) and Uniform Resource Characteristics (URCs), a metadata framework. As described in RFC 1737, and later in RFC 2141, URNs were distinguished from URLs, which identify resources by specifying their locations in the context of a particular access protocol, such as HTTP or FTP. In contrast, URNs were conceived as persistent, location-independent identifiers assigned within defined namespaces, typically by an authority responsible for the namespace, so that they are globally unique and persistent over long periods of time, even after the resource which they identify ceases to exist or becomes unavailable.

URCs never progressed past the conceptual stage, and other technologies such as the Resource Description Framework later took their place. Since RFC 3986 in 2005, use of the terms "Uniform Resource Name" and "Uniform Resource Locator" has been deprecated in technical standards in favor of the term Uniform Resource Identifier (URI), which encompasses both, a view proposed in 2001 by a joint working group between the World Wide Web Consortium (W3C) and Internet Engineering Task Force (IETF).

A URI is a string of characters used to identify or name a resource on the internet. URIs are used in many Internet protocols to refer to and access information resources. URI schemes include the http and ftp protocols, as well as hundreds of others.

In the "contemporary view", as it is called, all URIs identify or name resources, perhaps uniquely and persistently, with some of them also being "locators" which are resolvable in conjunction with a specified protocol to a representation of the resources.

Other URIs are not locators and are not necessarily resolvable within the bounds of the systems where they are found. These URIs may serve as names or identifiers of resources. Since resources can move, opaque identifiers which are not locators and are not bound to particular locations are arguably more likely than identifiers which are locators to remain unique and persistent over time. But whether a URI is resolvable depends on many operational and practical details, irrespective of whether it is called a "name" or a "locator". In the contemporary view, there is no bright line between "names" and "locators".

In accord with this way of thinking, the distinction between Uniform Resource Names and Uniform Resource Locators is now no longer used in formal Internet Engineering Task Force technical standards, though the latter term, URL, is still in wide informal use.

The term "URN" continues now as one of more than a hundred URI "schemes", urn:, paralleling http:, ftp:, and so forth. URIs of the urn: scheme are not locators, are not required to be associated with a particular protocol or access method, and need not be resolvable. They should be assigned by a procedure which provides some assurance that they will remain unique and identify the same resource persistently over a prolonged period. Some namespaces under the urn: scheme, such as urn:uuid: assign identifiers in a manner which does not require a registration authority, but most of them do. A typical URN namespace is urn:isbn, for International Standard Book Numbers. This view is continued in RFC 8141 (2017).

There are other URI schemes, such as tag:, info: (now largely deprecated), and ni: which are similar to the urn: scheme in not being locators and not being associated with particular resolution or access protocols.

== Syntax ==
The syntax of a urn: scheme URI is represented in the augmented Backus–Naur form as:

namestring    = assigned-name
                [ rq-components ]
                [ "#" f-component ]
assigned-name = "urn" ":" NID ":" NSS
NID           = (alphanum) 0*30(ldh) (alphanum)
ldh           = alphanum / "-"
NSS           = pchar *(pchar / "/")
rq-components = [ "?+" r-component ]
                [ "?=" q-component ]
r-component   = pchar *( pchar / "/" / "?" )
q-component   = pchar *( pchar / "/" / "?" )
f-component   = fragment

; general URI syntax rules (RFC3986)
fragment      = *( pchar / "/" / "?" )
pchar         = unreserved / pct-encoded / sub-delims / ":" / "@"
pct-encoded   = "%" HEXDIG HEXDIG
unreserved    = ALPHA / DIGIT / "-" / "." / "_" / "~"
sub-delims    = "!" / "$" / "&" / "'" / "(" / ")" / "*" / "+" / "," / ";" / "="

alphanum      = ALPHA / DIGIT  ; obsolete, usage is deprecated

or, in the form of a syntax diagram, as:

- The leading scheme (urn:) is case-insensitive.
- <NID> is the namespace identifier, and may include letters, digits, and -.
- The NID is followed by the namespace-specific string <NSS>, the interpretation of which depends on the specified namespace. The NSS may contain ASCII letters and digits, and many punctuation and special characters. Disallowed ASCII and Unicode characters may be included if percent-encoded.

In 2017, the syntax for URNs was updated:

- The slash character (/) is now allowed in the NSS to represent names containing slashes from non-URN identifier systems.
- The q-component was added to enable passing of parameters to named resources.
- The r-component was added to enable passing of parameters to resolvers. However, the updated specification notes that it should not be used until its semantics are defined via further standardization.

== Namespaces ==
In order to ensure the global uniqueness of URN namespaces, their identifiers (NIDs) are required to be registered with the IANA. Registered namespaces may be "formal" or "informal". An exception to the registration requirement was formerly made for "experimental namespaces", since rescinded by RFC 8141.

=== Formal ===
Approximately sixty formal URN namespace identifiers have been registered. These are namespaces where Internet users are expected to benefit from their publication, and are subject to several restrictions. They must:

- Not be an already-registered NID
- Not start with urn-
- Be more than two letters long
- Not start with XY-, where XY is any combination of two ASCII letters
- Not start with x- (see "Experimental namespaces", below)

=== Informal ===
Informal namespaces are registered with IANA and assigned a number sequence (chosen by IANA on a first-come-first-served basis) as an identifier, in the format

"urn-" ⟨number⟩

Informal namespaces are fully fledged URN namespaces and can be registered in global registration services.

=== Experimental ===
An exception to the registration requirement was formerly made for "experimental namespaces". However, following the deprecation of the "X-" notation for new identifier names, RFC 8141 did away with experimental URN namespaces, indicating a preference for use of the urn:example namespace where appropriate.

== Examples ==
URN	corresponds to
urn:isbn:0451450523	The 1968 book The Last Unicorn, identified by its International Standard Book Number.
urn:isan:0000-0000-2CEA-0000-1-0000-0000-Y	The 2002 film Spider-Man, identified by its International Standard Audiovisual Number.
urn:ISSN:0167-6423	The scientific journal Science of Computer Programming, identified by its International Standard Serial Number.
urn:ietf:rfc:2648	The IETF's RFC 2648.
urn:mpeg:mpeg7:schema:2001	The default namespace rules for MPEG-7 video metadata.
urn:oid:2.16.840	The OID for the United States.
urn:uuid:6e8bc430-9c3a-11d9-9669-0800200c9a66	A version 1 UUID.
urn:nbn:de:bvb:19-146642	A National Bibliography Number for a document, indicating country (de), regional network (bvb = Bibliotheksverbund Bayern), library number (19) and document number.
urn:lex:eu:council:directive:2010-03-09;2010-19-UE	A directive of the European Union, using the Lex URN namespace.
urn:lsid:zoobank.org:pub:CDC8D258-8F57-41DC-B560-247E17D3DC8C	A Life Science Identifiers that may be resolved to http://zoobank.org/urn:lsid:zoobank.org:pub:CDC8D258-8F57-41DC-B560-247E17D3DC8C .
urn:epc:class:lgtin:4012345.012345.998877	Global Trade Item Number with lot/batch number. As defined by Tag Data Standard (TDS). See more examples at EPC Identification Keys.
urn:epc:id:sgtin:0614141.112345.400	Global Trade Item Number with an individual serial number
urn:epc:id:sscc:0614141.1234567890	Serial Shipping Container Code
urn:epc:id:sgln:0614141.12345.400	Global Location Number with extension
urn:epc:id:bic:CSQU3054383	BIC Intermodal container Code as per ISO 6346
urn:epc:id:imovn:9176187	IMO Vessel Number of marine vessels
urn:epc:id:gdti:0614141.12345.400	Global Document Type Identifier of a document instance
urn:mrn:iala:aton:us:1234.5	Identifier for Marine Aids to Navigation
urn:mrn:iala:vts:ca:ecareg	Identifier for Vessel Traffic Services
urn:mrn:iala:wwy:us:atl:chba:potri	Identifier for Waterways
urn:mrn:iala:pub:g1143	Identifier for IALA publications
urn:microsoft:adfs:claimsxray	Identifier for federated identity; this example is from Claims X-Ray
urn:eic:10X1001A1001A450	European Network of Transmission System Operators for Electricity (ENTSO-E), identified by its Energy Identification Code

== See also ==
- Archival Resource Key (ARK)
- .arpa – urn.arpa is for dynamic discovery
- Extensible resource identifier (XRI)
- Handle System
- Info URI scheme
- Life Science Identifiers (LSID)
- The Magnet URI scheme, which uses URNs
- Persistent Uniform Resource Locator (PURL)
- Tag URI scheme is like urn: in its URIs not being resource locators
- Digital Object Identifier (DOI)
- EPC Identification Keys.
