= Uniform Resource Characteristic =

In IETF specifications, a Uniform Resource Characteristic (URC) is a string of characters representing the metadata of a Uniform Resource Identifier (URI), a string identifying a Web resource. URC metadata was envisioned to include sufficient information to support persistent identifiers, such as mapping a Uniform Resource Name (URN) to a current Uniform Resource Locator (URL). URCs were proposed as a specification in the mid-1990s, but were never adopted.

The use of a URC would allow the location of a Web resource to be obtained from its standard name, via the use of a resolving service. It was also to be possible to obtain a URC from a URN by the use of a resolving service. The design goals of URCs were that they should be simple to use, easy to extend, and compatible with a wide range of technological systems. The URC syntax was intended to be easily understood by both humans and software.

== History ==
The term "URC" was first coined as Uniform Resource Citation in 1992 by John Kunze within the IETF URI working group as a small package of metadata elements (which became the ERC) to accompany a hypertext link and meant to help users decide if the link might be interesting. The working group later changed the acronym expansion to Uniform Resource Characteristic, intended to provide a standardized representation of document properties, such as owner, encoding, access restrictions or cost. The group discussed URCs around 1994/1995, but it never produced a final standard and URCs were never widely adopted in practice. Even so, the concepts on which URCs were based influenced subsequent technologies such as the Dublin Core and Resource Description Framework.
