= Slugger =

A slugger most often means a baseball or softball player with a high slugging percentage.

Slugger or Sluggers may also refer to:

== Sports ==
- Louisville Slugger, a brand of baseball bat
- Berlin Sluggers, a German baseball team founded in 1985
- Abbeville Sluggers, an American minor league baseball team in 1920
- Slugger Labbe (born 1968), American NASCAR crew chief
- Slugger, a boxing style

== Music ==
- The Louisville Sluggers, also known as The Sluggers, a former Australian Swing Revival band formed in the late 1990s
- "Slugger", a 2024 single from the album Blood on the Silver Screen by Sasami

== See also ==
- Silver Slugger Award, an annual baseball award presented to the best offensive player at each position in both the American League and the National League
- Louisville Slugger Field, a baseball stadium in Louisville, Kentucky
- Louieville Sluggah, stage name of rapper Barret Powell (born 1976)
- Sluger, a historical rank in Moldavia and Wallachia
- Slug (disambiguation)
