= Permalink =

Permanent web hyperlink

A permalink or permanent link is a URL that is intended to remain unchanged for many years into the future, yielding a hyperlink that is less susceptible to link rot. Permalinks are often rendered simply, that is, as clean URLs, to be easier to type and remember. Most modern blogging and content-syndication software systems support such links. Sometimes URL shortening is used to create them.

A permalink is a type of persistent identifier and the word permalink is sometimes used as a synonym of persistent identifier. More often, though, permalink is applied to persistent identifiers which are generated by a content management system for pages served by that system. This usage is especially common in the blogosphere. Such links are not maintained by an outside authority, and their persistence is dependent on the durability of the content management system itself.

== History ==
In the early years of the web, all content was static, and thus all hyperlinks pointed at a filename. Soon, though, many web pages became dynamic, and many URLs began to include query terms.

One cited early use of the term permalink in its current sense was by Jason Kottke on March 5, 2000, in a post titled: "Finally. Did you notice the". Matthew Haughey had discussed a permalink-style feature with Blogger co-founders Evan Williams and Paul Bausch the previous weekend, and Bausch had pointed out that it was technically feasible to produce permanent links in Blogger, using a feature (written by him) that allowed the ID of a post to be placed in a Blogger template. In response to Kottke's blog, on March 6, 2000, Haughey posted the technical details on his own weblog, which helped open the way to widespread adoption.

== Purpose ==
Permanence in links is desirable when content items are likely to be linked to, from, or cited by a source outside the originating organization. Before the advent of large-scale dynamic websites built on database-backed content management systems, it was more common for URLs of specific pieces of content to be static and human-readable, as URL structure and naming were dictated by the entity creating that content. Increased volume of content and difficulty of management led to the rise of database-driven systems, and the resulting unwieldy and often-changing URLs necessitated deliberate policies with regard to URL design and link permanence.

For example, Wikipedia's internal Common Gateway Interface-based URLs are made more readable by simplifying them. The internal URI for a Wikipedia article named Example, which is http://en.wikipedia.org/w/index.php?title=Example, is generated via URL rewriting from the more human-readable external URL, http://en.wikipedia.org/wiki/Example.

An entry in a blog with many entries is accessible from the site's front page for only a short time. Visitors who store the URL for a particular entry often find upon their return that the desired content has been replaced by something new. Prominently posting permalinks is a method employed by bloggers to encourage visitors to store a more long-lived URL (the permalink) for reference.

Permalinks frequently consist of a string of characters that represent the date and time of posting, and an identifier that denotes the author who initially authored the item or its subject. Crucially, if an item is changed, renamed, or moved within the internal database, its permalink remains unaltered, as it functions as a magic cookie that references an internal database identifier. If an item is deleted altogether, its permalink can frequently not be reused.

Permalinks have subsequently been exploited for a number of innovations, including link tracing and link trackback in weblogs, and referring to specific weblog entries in RSS or Atom syndication streams.

=== PURL ===
Both permalink and PURL (persistent uniform resource locator) are used as a persistent URL, and redirect to the location of the requested web resource. The main differences in the concepts are about domain name and time scale: PURL uses an independent dedicated domain name, and is intended to last for decades; permalinks usually do not change the URL's domain, and are intended for use on timescales of years.

== Versioning ==
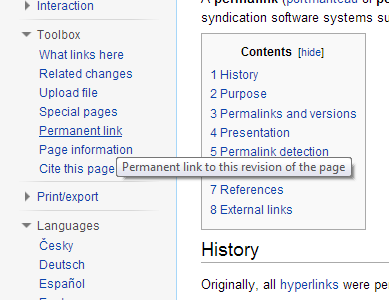
On Wikipedia, a permanent link to a specific version of an article is obtained from the "Permanent link" entry in the toolbox.

Many blogging and content management systems do not support versioning of content, that is, if an entry is updated, a uniquely accessible version is not created. Thus, in the context of these systems, a permalink may refer to different content over time. In the context of systems that support versioning, such as most wikis, a permalink is commonly understood as a link to a specific version. Here, both the link itself and the resource it refers to should not change over time.

MediaWiki, the software that runs Wikipedia, supports this type of permanent link. In its current implementation, old versions of specific articles, images, and templates are referenceable by unique unchanging URLs, though current entries may not use old versions of images and templates. Permanent links to specific versions are recommended for citing articles from sources such as Wikipedia and Wikinews, to ensure that the content remains unchanged for review. A reviewer can then view the cited revision, the current revision, and the differences between the two.

== Presentation ==
Blog entries are usually laid out as follows:

- Title
- Date
- Body
- Comments, permalink, and what category the entry was posted to (known as metadata)

Permalinks are usually denoted by text link (i.e. "Permalink" or "Link to this Entry"), but sometimes a symbol may be used. The most common symbol used is the hash sign, or #. However, certain websites employ their own symbol to represent a permalink such as an asterisk, a dash, a pilcrow (¶), a section sign (§), or a unique icon.

== Detection ==
Permalinks can be indicated within the HTML of a page to allow automated browsing tools to detect the permalink and use it for linking instead of the stated URL. The link element should include the following attributes:

<link rel="bookmark" href="http://example.com/bookmark/123/" />

== See also ==
- Persistent identifier
- Deep linking
- Digital object identifier (DOI)
- Persistent uniform resource locator (PURL)
- Uniform Resource Identifier (URI)
- URL mapping
- Perma.cc
