= Link rot =

URLs ceasing to function

A broken link usually leads to a 404 Not Found message.

Link rot (also called link death, link breaking, or reference rot) is the phenomenon of hyperlinks tending over time to cease to point to their originally targeted file, web page, or server due to that resource being relocated to a new address or becoming permanently unavailable. A link that no longer resolves at the intended target may be called broken or dead. Link rot can be avoided by designing stable and clean URLs, avoiding deep linking, and the use of web archives.

The rate of link rot is a subject of study and research due to its significance to the internet's ability to preserve information. Estimates of that rate vary dramatically between studies. Information professionals have warned that link rot could make important archival data disappear, potentially impacting the legal system and scholarship.

== Prevalence ==
A number of studies have examined the prevalence of link rot within the World Wide Web, in academic literature that uses URLs to cite web content, and within digital libraries.

In a 2023 study of the Million Dollar Homepage external links, it was found that 27% of the links resulted in a site loading with no redirects, 45% of links have been redirected, and 28% returned various error messages.

A 2002 study suggested that link rot within digital libraries is considerably slower than on the web. The article found that about 3% of the objects were no longer accessible after one year, equating to a half-life of nearly 23 years.

A 2003 study found that on the Web, about one link out of every 200 broke each week, suggesting a half-life of 138 weeks. This rate was largely confirmed by a 2016–2017 study of links in Yahoo! Directory (which had stopped updating in 2014 after 21 years of development) that found the half-life of the directory's links to be two years.

A 2004 study showed that subsets of Web links (such as those targeting specific file types or those hosted by academic institutions) could have dramatically different half-lives. The URLs selected for publication appear to have greater longevity than the average URL. A 2015 study by Weblock analyzed more than 180,000 links from references in the full-text corpora of three major open access publishers and found a half-life of about 14 years, generally confirming a 2005 study that found that half of the URLs cited in D-Lib Magazine articles were active 10 years after publication. Other studies have found higher rates of link rot in academic literature but typically suggest a half-life of four years or greater. A 2013 study in BMC Bioinformatics analyzed nearly 15,000 links in abstracts from Thomson Reuters's Web of Science citation index and found that the median lifespan of web pages was 9.3 years, and just 62% were archived. A 2021 study of external links in New York Times articles published between 1996 and 2019 found a half-life of about 15 years (with significant variance among content topics) but noted that 13% of functional links no longer lead to the original content—a phenomenon called content drift.

A 2013 study found that 49% of links in U.S. Supreme Court opinions are dead.

A 2023 study looking at United States COVID-19 dashboards found that 23% of the state dashboards available in February 2021 were no longer available at the previous URLs in April 2023.

Pew Research found that, in 2023, 38% of pages from 2013 went missing. Also, in 2023, 54% of English Wikipedia articles had a dead link in the 'references' section and 23% of news articles linked to a dead URL.

== Causes ==
Link rot can result for several reasons. A target web page may be removed. The server that hosts the target page could fail, be removed from service, or relocate to a new domain name. As far back as 1999, it was noted that with the amount of material that can be stored on a hard drive, "a single disk failure could be like the burning of the library at Alexandria." A domain name's registration may lapse or be transferred to another party. Some causes will result in the link failing to find any target and returning an error such as HTTP 404. Other causes will cause a link to target content other than that which was intended by the link's author.

Other reasons for broken links include:

- the restructuring of websites that causes changes in URLs (e.g. domain.net/pine_tree might be moved to domain.net/tree/pine)
- relocation of formerly free content to behind a paywall
- a change in server architecture that results in code such as PHP functioning differently
- dynamic page content such as search results that changes by design
- deletion of the target page and/or its content
- the presence of user-specific information (such as a login name) within the link
- deliberate blocking by content filters or firewalls
- the expiration of a domain name registration

== Prevention and detection ==
Strategies for preventing link rot can focus on placing content where its likelihood of persisting is higher, authoring links that are less likely to be broken, taking steps to preserve existing links, or repairing links whose targets have been relocated or removed.

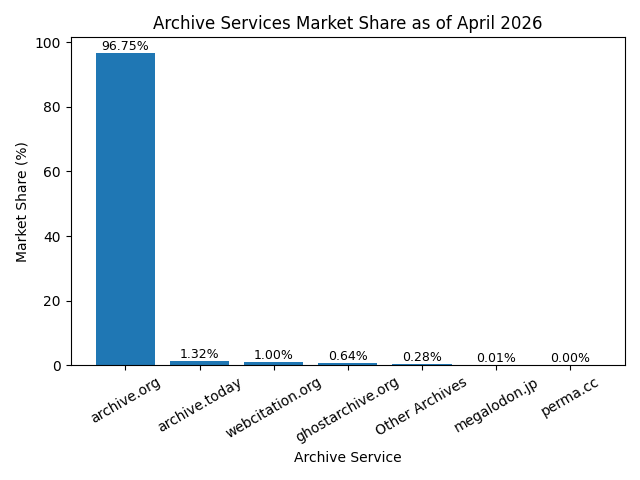
The Wayback Machine accounts for 96.75% of Wikipedia citations.

The creation of URLs that will not change with time is the fundamental method of preventing link rot. Preventive planning has been championed by Tim Berners-Lee and other web pioneers. Berners-Lee recommended designing URIs to avoid details likely to change, such as authorship, subject matter, file extension, software mechanism, or access status.

Strategies pertaining to the authorship of links include:

- prioritizing stable sites
- avoiding links that point to resources on researchers' personal pages
- using clean URLs or otherwise employing URL normalization or URL canonicalization
- using permalinks and persistent identifiers such as ARKs, DOIs, Handle System references, PURLs, or content addressing
- avoiding linking to documents other than web pages
- avoiding deep linking
- linking to web archives such as the Internet Archive, WebCite, archive.today, Perma.cc, Amber, or Arweave

Strategies pertaining to the protection of existing links include:

- using redirection mechanisms such as HTTP 301 to automatically refer browsers and crawlers to relocated content.
- using content management systems which can automatically update links when content within the same site is relocated or automatically replace links with canonical URLs
- integrating search resources into HTTP 404 pages

The detection of broken links may be done manually or automatically. Automated methods include plug-ins for content management systems as well as standalone broken-link checkers such as like Xenu's Link Sleuth. Automatic checking may not detect links that return a soft 404 or links that return a 200 OK response but point to content that has changed.

== See also ==
- Archive Team – Group dedicated to web archiving and digital preservation
- Dead Internet theory
- Digital preservation – Practice to keep digital assets accessible in long term
- Infodemic – Rapid spread of accurate and inaccurate information
- Lost media – General term for inaccessible media
- Software rot – Degradation or loss of the use of software over time
