= Slug (publishing) =

Short name given to a newspaper article in production

In newspaper editing, a slug is a short name given to an article that is in production. The story is labeled with its slug as it makes its way from the reporter through the editorial process. The AP Stylebook prescribes its use by wire reporters (in a "keyword slugline") as follows: "The keyword or slug (sometimes more than one word) clearly indicates the content of the story." Sometimes a slug also contains code information that tells editors specific information about the story — for example, the letters "AM" at the beginning of a slug on a wire story tell editors that the story is meant for morning papers, while the letters "CX" indicate that the story is a correction to an earlier story.

In the production process of print advertisements, a slug or slug line, refers to the "name" of a particular advertisement. Advertisements usually have several markers, ad numbers or job numbers and slug lines. Usually the slug references the offer or headline and is used to differentiate between different ad runs.

== Etymology ==
"The origin of the term slug derives from the days of hot-metal printing, when printers set type by hand in a small form called a stick. Later huge Linotype machines turned molten lead into casts of letters, lines, sentences and paragraphs. A line of lead in both eras was known as a slug."

== See also ==
- Screenplay slug line
- Slug (web publishing)
- Slug (typesetting)
