= Indecs Content Model =

indecs (an acronym of "interoperability of data in e-commerce systems"; written in lower case) was a project partly funded by the European Community Info 2000 initiative and by several organisations representing the music, rights, text publishing, authors, library and other sectors in 1998–2000, which has since been used in a number of metadata activities. A final report and related documents were published; the indecs Metadata Framework document is a concise summary.

indecs provided an analysis of the requirements for metadata for e-commerce of content (intellectual property) in the network environment, focusing on semantic interoperability.

indecs was built from a simple generic model of commerce (the "model of making"): a model of the life cycle of any kind of content from conception to the final physical or digital copies. Central to the analysis is the assumption that it is possible to produce a generic mechanism to handle complex metadata for all different types of content. So, for example, instead of treating sound carriers, books, videos and photographs as fundamentally different things with different (if similar) characteristics, they are all recognised as creations with different values of the same higher-level attributes, whose metadata can be supported in a common environment.

== Framework ==
The indecs framework underlines the importance of unique identification of all entities. It also raises the question of authority: the identification of the person making the claim is as significant as the identification of any other entity.

== Usage ==
The indecs framework does not presuppose any specific business model or legal framework; it can be used to describe transactions involving copyrighted, open source, or freely available material. The framework has been further developed as a generic ontology-based approach. Its main use to date has been in applications of commercial transactions of content and in some library-related applications. Developments include the OntologyX semantic engineering tools and services from Rightscom.com. The approach also has much in common with the CIDOC Conceptual Reference Model (CRM), an ontology for cultural heritage information, and the Functional Requirements for Bibliographic Records (FRBR) model.

One of the deliverables of the indecs project was a specification for a directory of parties. This led to a subsequent project, Interparty, funded under the European Commission's Information Society Technologies Programme, to design and specify a network to support interoperability of party identification (for both natural and corporate names) across different domains, building on the indecs principles. InterParty was not proposed as a replacement for existing schemes, but as a means of effecting their interoperation. Some of its conclusions have been used elsewhere, e.g., in the work on the proposed ISO ISNI (International Standard Name Identifier).

== Intellectual property rights ==
indecs does not attempt to replace intellectual property rights law, though a specific set of legal elements might be included in an indecs-based structure, and the indecs framework specifically includes some definitions of intellectual property rights from major international treaties such as the Berne Convention and the WIPO Copyright Treaty.
