= Persistent identifier =

Long-lasting digital name

An introduction to persistent identifiers and FAIR data

A persistent identifier (PI or PID) is a long-lasting identifier to a document, file, web page, or other object. The term "persistent identifier" is usually used in the context of digital objects that are accessible over the Internet. Typically, such an identifier is not only persistent but actionable: you can plug it into a web browser and be taken to the identified source.

Of course, the issue of persistent identification predates the Internet. Over centuries, writers and scholars developed standards for citation of paper-based documents so that readers could reliably and efficiently find a source that a writer mentioned in a footnote or bibliography. After the Internet started to become an important source of information in the 1990s, the issue of citation standards became important in the online world as well. Studies have shown that within a few years of being cited, a significant percentage of web addresses go "dead", a process often called link rot. Using a persistent identifier can slow or stop this process.

An important aspect of persistent identifiers is that "persistence is purely a matter of service". That means that persistent identifiers are only persistent to the degree that someone commits to resolving them for users. No identifier can be inherently persistent, however many persistent identifiers are created within institutionally administered systems with the aim to maximise longevity.

However, some regular URLs (i.e. web addresses), maintained by the website owner, are intended to be long-lasting; these are often called permalinks.

== Examples ==
People and organisations:

- Open Researcher and Contributor ID (ORCID)
- Research Organization Registry (ROR)

Publications:

- Virtual International Authority File (VIAF)
- International Standard Name Identifier (ISNI)
- International Standard Book Number (ISBN)

Uniform Resource Identifiers:

- Archival Resource Key (ARK), with 8.2 billion ARKs issued.
- Handle System
- Digital Object Identifier (DOI), with 200 million DOIs issued.
- Magnet link (decentralized, with BitTorrent)
- Uniform Resource Names (URNs)
- Extensible Resource Identifiers (XRIs)
- Persistent Uniform Resource Locators (PURLs)
- Software Hash Identifier (SWHID)
- Wikidata Identifier (e.g QIDs)

Combined persistent identifier and archiving functionality is provided by services such as the Internet Archive perma.cc, archive.today, and WebCite such that anyone can archive a web page to prevent link rot of a URL.

== See also ==
- Authority control
