= Info URI scheme =

URI scheme for information assets with identifiers in public namespaces

In computing, info is a Uniform Resource Identifier (URI) scheme which enables identifiers from public namespaces to be represented as URIs, when they would otherwise have no canonical URL form, such as Library of Congress identifiers, Handle System handles, and Digital object identifiers.

== Specification ==
The specification for the info scheme is provided by the Informational RFC 4452.

== Example ==
The following is an example of an info URI:

info:ddc/22/eng//004.678

In this example, "ddc" designates the Dewey Decimal Classification namespace and "22/eng//004.678" is the identifier within that namespace.

== Namespace registry ==
Between 2003 and 2010, info namespaces were registered by the Online Computer Library Center (OCLC) Office of Research on behalf of the National Information Standards Organization (NISO), an American library standards body. About 30 namespaces were registered.

In 2010, the registry was closed, in view of the increasing importance of the W3C Linked Data paradigm, and adopters of the info scheme were advised to migrate resource identity requirements towards "mainstream Web practices."
