= Webcal =

Unofficial URI scheme for accessing iCalendar files

Webcal is a uniform resource identifier (URI) scheme for accessing iCalendar files.

The webcal scheme was devised for use with the Apple iCal application and is widely used for accessing iCalendar formatted files. As of 23 September 2012, it has provisional status with IANA. The webcal: protocol prefix is used to trigger an external protocol handler which is passed the URL to the .ics file rather than the file itself, in much the same way feed is sometimes used to trigger external RSS readers. The idea is that with this protocol prefix the target .ics file should be subscribed to (read only) rather than downloaded or imported into the calendar application. Other than that webcal: URLs are equivalent to the same URL with http: or https:.

WebCal was also the name of an unrelated free web calendar PERL script, that allowed you to create and maintain an interactive events calendar or scheduling system on a Web site or app, and is no longer supported.

== Handlers ==
Notable software packages and web applications supporting the webcal protocol include:

- Apple Calendar
- Google Calendar
- Microsoft Outlook
- Mozilla Thunderbird
- Nextcloud

== Alternative protocols ==
CalDAV and GroupDAV are both efforts to provide WebDAV-based interactive access to calendar stores with finer granularity. The CalDAV Access protocol has been standardized by the IETF and published as RFC 4791. Extensions to CalDAV for automated scheduling are also standardized, as RFC 6638.

Neither of those protocols calls for using DAV style URIs. Instead, both drafts call for using the HTTP OPTIONS feature to return that the server supports calendaring extensions.

== See also ==
- List of URI schemes
