= Postback =

In web development, a postback is the exchange of information between servers to report a user's action on a website, network, or app.

Technically speaking, a postback is an HTTP POST to the same page that the form is on. In other words, the contents of the form are POSTed back to the same URL as the form.

Postbacks are commonly seen in edit forms, where the user introduces information in a form and hits "save" or "submit", causing a postback. The server then refreshes the same page using the information it has just received.

Postbacks are most commonly discussed in relation to JSF and ASP or ASP.NET.

In ASP, a form and its POST action have to be created as two separate pages, resulting in the need for an intermediate page and a redirect if one simply wants to perform a postback. This problem was addressed in ASP.NET with the __doPostBack() function and an application model that allows a page to perform validation and processing on its own form data.

In JSF, postbacks trigger the full JSF life-cycle, which just like ASP.NET performs conversion and validation of the form data that was included in the postback. Various utility methods are present in the JSF API to programmatically check if a given request is a postback or not.

== Postback types ==
- Postback for Affiliate Networks
- Postback for Traffic Flows
- Postback Macros

== See also ==
- Ajax (programming)
- ASP.NET
- JavaServer Faces
