= URI fragment =

Text after the # in a resource URI

In computer hypertext, a URI fragment is a string of characters that refers to a resource that is subordinate to another, primary resource. The primary resource is identified by a Uniform Resource Identifier (URI), and the fragment identifier points to the subordinate resource.

The fragment identifier introduced by a hash mark # is the optional last part of a URL for a document. It is typically used to identify a portion of that document. The generic syntax is specified in RFC 3986. The hash mark separator in URIs is not part of the fragment identifier.

== Basics ==
In URIs, a hash mark # introduces the optional fragment near the end of the URL. The generic RFC 3986 syntax for URIs also allows an optional query part introduced by a question mark ?. In URIs with a query and a fragment, the fragment follows the query. Query parts depend on the URI scheme and are evaluated by the server—e.g., http: supports queries unlike ftp:. Fragments depend on the document MIME type and are evaluated by the client (web browser). Clients are not supposed to send URI fragments to servers when they retrieve a document.

A URI ending with # is permitted by the generic syntax and is a kind of empty fragment. In MIME document types such as text/html or any XML type, empty identifiers to match this syntactically legal construct are not permitted. Web browsers typically display the top of the document for an empty fragment.

The fragment identifier functions differently to the rest of the URI: its processing is exclusively client-side with no participation from the web server, though the server typically helps to determine the MIME type, and the MIME type determines the processing of fragments. When an agent (such as a web browser) requests a web resource from a web server, the agent sends the URI to the server, but does not send the fragment. Instead, the agent waits for the server to send the resource, and then the agent processes the resource according to the document type and fragment value.

In an HTML web page, the agent will look for an anchor identified with an HTML tag that includes an id= or name= attribute equal to the fragment identifier.

== Examples ==
- In URIs for MIME text/html pages such as http://www.example.org/foo.html#bar the fragment refers to the element with id="bar".
  - Graphical Web browsers typically scroll to position pages so that the top of the element identified by the fragment id is aligned with the top of the viewport; thus fragment identifiers are often used in tables of contents.
  - The appearance of the identified element can be changed through the :target CSS pseudoclass. Wikipedia uses this to highlight the selected reference. Notably CSS display: block can be used to show content only if it is the target, and otherwise hidden by display: none.
  - The name attribute of the <a> element served the same purpose, but is now obsolete in favor of the id attribute, which can be applied to any element.
- In all XML document types including XHTML fragments corresponding to an xml:id or similar id attributes follow the Name-syntax and begin with a letter, underscore, or colon. Notably they cannot begin with a digit or hyphen.
  - xml:id is one of the few generic XML attributes, e.g., xml:lang, which can be used without explicitly declaring a namespace. In XHTML id can also be used and seems to be preferred, because XHTML was specified before xml:id existed.
- In XML applications, fragment identifiers in a certain syntax can be XPointers; for example, the fragment identifier in the URI http://www.example.org/foo.xml#xpointer(//Rube) refers to all XML elements named "Rube" in the document identified by the URI http://www.example.org/foo.xml. An XPointer processor, given that URI, would obtain a representation of the document (such as by requesting it from the Internet) and would return a representation of the document's "Rube" elements.
- In RDF vocabularies, such as RDFS, OWL, or SKOS, fragment identifiers are used to identify resources in the same XML Namespace, but are not necessarily corresponding to a specific part of a document. For example, http://www.w3.org/2004/02/skos/core#broader identifies the concept "broader" in SKOS Core vocabulary, but it does not refer to a specific part of the resource identified by http://www.w3.org/2004/02/skos/core, a complete RDF file in which semantics of this specific concept is declared, along with other concepts in the same vocabulary.
- In URIs for MIME text/plain documents RFC 5147 specifies a fragment identifier for the character and line positions and ranges within the document using the keywords "char" and "line", and an integrity check can be added, either "length" or "md5". Browser support seems lacking. The following example identifies lines 11 through 20 of a text document:
  - http://example.com/document.txt#line=10,20
- In URIs for MIME text/csv documents, RFC 7111 specifies a fragment identifier as a selector for rows, columns, and cells using the keywords "row" , "col", and "cell", For example:
  - http://example.com/data.csv#row=4 – Selects the 4th row.
  - http://example.com/data.csv#col=2 – Selects 2nd column.
  - http://example.com/data.csv#row=5-7 – Selects three consecutive rows starting with 5th row.
  - http://example.com/data.csv#row=5-* – Selects all rows starting with 5th row.
  - http://example.com/data.csv#cell=4,1-6,2 – Selects a region that starts at the 4th row and the 1st column and ends at the 6th row and the 2nd column.
- In URIs for MIME audio/*, image/*, video/* documents, very few have defined fragments or fragment semantics. The Media Fragments URI 1.0 (basic) syntax supports addressing a media resource along two dimensions (temporal and spatial) using the keywords t and xywh, and Media Fragments 1.0 URI (advanced) adds track and id. Therefore, one can use the following media fragments URI in the src attribute of the audio or video HTML5 element:
  - http://example.com/foo.mp4#t=10,20 (this indicates the time interval starting at 10 seconds and ending before 20 seconds)
  - http://example.com/bar.webm#t=40,80&xywh=160,120,320,240
  - The specification also allows for specifying hours, minutes (must be 2 digits), and seconds (must be 2 digits) using colons, and milliseconds using a decimal point. Other time schemes may also be able to be specified through prefixes, with npt: (Normal Play Time) being the default.
  - Other websites use the fragment part to pass some extra information to scripts running on them – for example, Google Video understands permalinks in the format of #01h25m30s to start playing at the specified position, and YouTube uses similar code such as #t=3m25s.
- In JavaScript, the fragment identifier of the current HTML or XHTML page can be accessed in the "hash" property location.hash – JavaScript can be also used with other document types. With the rise of AJAX, some websites use fragment identifiers to emulate the back button behavior of browsers for page changes that do not require a reload, or to emulate subpages.
  - For example, Gmail uses a single URL for almost every interface – mail boxes, individual mails, search results, settings – the fragment is used to make these interfaces directly linkable.
  - Adobe Flash websites can use the fragment part to inform the user about the state of the website or web application, and to facilitate deep linking, commonly with the help of the SWFAddress JavaScript library.
- A URI that links to a JSON document can specify a pointer to a specific value.
  - For example, a URL ending in #/foo could be used to extract the value from a key-value pair in a document beginning with { "foo": ["bar", "baz"], ... }
- In URIs for MIME application/pdf documents PDF viewers recognize a number of fragment identifiers. For instance, a URL ending in .pdf#page=35 will cause most readers to open the PDF and scroll to page 35. Several other parameters are possible, including #nameddest= (similar to HTML anchors), #search="word1 word2", #zoom=, etc. Multiple parameters can be combined with ampersands:
  - http://example.org/doc.pdf#view=fitb&nameddest=Chapter3.
- In SVG, fragments are allowed to specify arguments such as viewBox(), preserveAspectRatio(), and transform().
- To identifying a text snippet within the text, the fragment ":~:text=[prefix-,]textStart[,textEnd][,-suffix] will highlight "textStart", or forward to "textEnd" if applied. The prefix and suffix will not be highlighted but helps finding the text on the page. Example: https://en.wikipedia.org/w/index.php?title=Cat&oldid=916388819#:~:text=Claws-,Like%20almost,the%20Felidae%2C,-cats

== Proposals ==
Several proposals have been made for fragment identifiers for use with plain text documents (which cannot store anchor metadata), or to refer to locations within HTML documents in which the author has not used anchor tags:

- As of September 2012 the Media Fragments URI 1.0 (basic) is a W3C Recommendation.
- Chrome versions 80 and above and Firefox versions 131 and above implement W3C's WICG Text Fragments, so #:~:text=foo will cause the browser to search for foo, highlight the matching text, and scroll to it. Besides the start and end, the snippet can also specify a context: text that must precede or follow foo but will not be highlighted (example that uses #:~:text=night-,vision to find 'vision' preceded by 'night').
- The Python Package Index appends the MD5 hash of a file to the URL as a fragment identifier. If MD5 were unbroken (it is a broken hash function), it could be used to ensure the integrity of the package.
  https://pypi.python.org ... zodbbrowser-0.3.1.tar.gz#md5=38dc89f294b24691d3f0d893ed3c119c
- A hash-bang fragment is a fragment starting with an exclamation mark !. It was used in a now-deprecated approach to index dynamic single-page applications. An exclamation mark is illegal in HTML4, XHTML, and XML identifiers, granting certain degree of separation from that functionality. However, it is allowed in HTML5.
  - Between 2009 and 2015, Google Webmaster Central proposed and then recommended an "AJAX crawling scheme" using an initial exclamation mark in fragment identifiers for stateful AJAX pages:
    http://example.com/page?query#!state
  - Another implementation has been the replacement of #! with ?_escaped_fragment_=
  - Hash-bang URIs have been considered problematic by a number of writers including Jeni Tennison at the W3C because they make pages inaccessible to those who do not have JavaScript activated in their browser. They also break HTTP referer headers as browsers are not allowed to send the fragment identifier in the Referer header.
  - In 2015, Google deprecated their hash-bang AJAX crawling proposal, recommending instead the use of progressive enhancement and HTML5's history.pushState() method.
  - Mozilla Foundation employee Gervase Markham has proposed a fragment identifier for searching, of the form #!s!search terms. Adding a number after the s (#!s10!) indicates that the browser should search for the nth occurrence of the search term. A negative number (#!s-3!) starts searching backwards from the end of the document. A Greasemonkey script is available to add this functionality to compatible browsers.
    http://example.com/index.html#!s3!search terms
- Erik Wilde and Marcel Baschnagel of the ETH Zurich extend this to also identify fragments in plain text documents using regular expressions, with the keyword "match". They also describe a prototype implementation as an extension for the Firefox browser. For example, the following would find the case-insensitive text "RFC" anywhere in the document:
  http://example.com/document.txt#match=[rR][fF][cC]
- K. Yee of the Foresight Institute proposes "extended fragment identifiers" delimited with colons and a keyword to differentiate them from anchor identifiers. A text search fragment identifier with "fragment specification scheme" id "words" is the first proposal in this scheme. The following example would search a document for the first occurrence of the string "some context for a search term" and then highlight the words "search term":
  http://example.com/index.html#:words:some-context-for-a-(search-term)
- The LiveURLs project proposed a fragment identifier format for referring to a region of text within a page, of the form #FWS+C, where F is the length of the first word (up to five characters), W is the first word itself, S is the length of the selected text and C is a 32-bit CRC of the selected text. They implemented a variant of this scheme as an extension for the Firefox browser, using the form #LFWS+C, where L is the length of the fragment itself, in two hex digits. Linking to the word "Fragment" using the implemented variant would yield:
  http://example.com/index.html#115Fragm8+-52f89c4c
- Up until Firefox 5, Firefox supported XPath links such as #xpath:/html/body/div[3] which could be used in conjunction with a bookmarklet such as http://antimatter15.com/wp/2009/11/xpath-bookmark-bookmarklet/ to link within HTML documents that lacked proper IDs. This feature was removed as part of a code cleanup in https://bugzilla.mozilla.org/show_bug.cgi?id=457102
- In ePub electronic book format, the EPUB Canonical Fragment Identifier (epubcfi, 2011-2017) defines a W3C/IDPF-standardized method for referencing arbitrary content using fragment identifiers to locate non-anchored text ranges via document structure and pattern matching. These dynamic deep links assist in locating content after text is updated and are used, for example, in Apple Books.

== See also ==
- Query string
- URI normalization
- URL (Uniform Resource Locator)
- Clean URL
- URI scheme
