= List of URI schemes =

Namespace identifier assigned by IANA

This article lists common URI schemes. A Uniform Resource Identifier helps identify a source without ambiguity. Many URI schemes are registered with the IANA; however, there exist many unofficial URI schemes as well. Mobile deep links are one example of a class of unofficial URI schemes that allow for linking directly to a specific location in a mobile app.

== Official IANA-registered schemes ==
URI schemes registered with the IANA, both provisional and fully approved, are listed in its registry for Uniform Resource Identifier (URI) Schemes. These include well known schemes such as:

- file – File URI scheme
- ftp – File Transfer Protocol
- http – Hypertext Transfer Protocol
- https – Hypertext Transfer Protocol Secure
- mailto – mailto for email addresses
- tel – for telephone numbers
- imap – Internet Message Access Protocol
- irc – Internet Relay Chat
- nntp – Network News Transfer Protocol

as well as many lesser known schemes such as:

- acap – Application Configuration Access Protocol
- ace – ACE Governed Intelligence
- icap – Internet Content Adaptation Protocol
- mtqp – Message Tracking Query Protocol (RFC 3887)
- wss – Encrypted WebSocket connections

== Unofficial but common URI schemes ==
Scheme	Purpose	Defined by	General format	Notes
admin	URL scheme in the GNOME desktop environment to access file(s) with administrative permissions with GUI applications in a safer way, instead of sudo, gksu & gksudo, which may be considered insecure	GNOME Virtual file system	admin:/⟨path⟩/⟨to⟩/⟨file⟩ example: gedit admin:/etc/default/grub	
at	Reference individual records in a specific repository, identified by either DID or handle..	AT Protocol	at://<authority>/<collection>/<rkey>	
app	URL scheme can be used by packaged applications to obtain resources that are inside a container	Google	app://⟨application⟩/⟨path⟩ example: app://com.foo.bar/index.html	
freeplane	Open a Freemind/Freeplane .mm file in the locally installed Freeplane application and optionally highlight a node in the opened mindmap.	Freeplane v1.3 and above	freeplane:/%20⟨path to file⟩#ID_⟨node number⟩ freeplane:/%20⟨path to file⟩#:⟨path⟩/⟨in⟩/⟨map⟩/⟨to⟩/⟨node⟩	
geo	Open a geographic location in a two or three-dimensional coordinate reference system on your preferred maps application.	Internet Engineering Task Force's RFC 5870 (published 8 June 2010)	geo:⟨x⟩,⟨y⟩example: geo:37.7904462,-122.4017974	See more information on: Geo URI scheme. Alternatively, maps: may be implemented in some clients.
itms	The iTunes Media Store URI scheme, is used to open store listings in the iTunes application on Windows, Mac, iOS.	Apple	itms://itunes.apple.com/<Country Code>/<Media Type>/<Content Title>/<Content ID> <Media Type> can be: album, movie, tv-season, podcast, audiobook, app itms-apps:// is used for Mac App Store and iOS App Store	
javascript	Execute JavaScript code.	IETF Draft	javascript:⟨javascript to execute⟩	
jdbc	Connect a database with Java Database Connectivity technology.	Database vendor dependent	jdbc:somejdbcvendor:other_data... jdbc:oracle:oci:@host:port(sid or [/service])?params... jdbc:sqlserver://serverName\instanceName:portNumber;params... jdbc:mysql://host:port/database?params...	Requires a vendor provided connector (jar archive) to be included in the client library.
minecraft	Used to run actions on the game Minecraft: Bedrock Edition.	Mojang Studios	Explained here.	
msteams	Used by Microsoft to launch the Microsoft Teams desktop client	Microsoft	msteams:/l/...	
ms-access ms-excel ms-infopath ms-powerpoint ms-project ms-publisher ms-spd ms-visio ms-word	Used by Microsoft to launch Microsoft Office applications	Microsoft	⟨scheme-name⟩:⟨command-name⟩|⟨command-argument-descriptor⟩|⟨command-argument⟩ example: ms-excel:ofv|u|<https://contoso/Q4/budget.xls>	
odbc	Open Database Connectivity	IETF Draft		
psns	Used by PlayStation consoles to open the PS Store application, also used by Media Go	Sony (not public)	psns://browse?product=⟨ContentID⟩If entered without parameters, like psns:// it opens the PS Store or Media Go app main page.	
rdar	URL scheme used by Apple's internal issue-tracking system	Apple (not public)	rdar://⟨issue number⟩ example: rdar://10198949	Allows employees to link to internally-tracked issues from anywhere. Example of a private scheme which has leaked in to the public space and is widely seen on the internet, but can only be resolved by Apple employees.
s3	Used to interact programmatically with Amazon S3 bucket	aws-cli documentation	aws s3 sync /tmp/foo/ s3://bucket/ --recursive \  --exclude "*" --include "*.jpg" --include "*.txt"	
shortcuts	A scheme used by Apple to execute a Shortcut from apps that support links	Apple	shortcuts://run-shortcut?name=Add20%to20%Notes&input=clipboard	
steam	The steam URI scheme, also known as the "Steam Browser Protocol", is used by the Steam store webapp to open the desktop application or to run a specific command if the app is already opened. The command to run is also specified along with the URI itself.	Steam (service)	steam://<command>	
slack	Used by Slack to launch the Slack client	Slack API reference	slack://open?team={TEAM_ID}	
trueconf	Used by TrueConf Server to interact with client applications	TrueConf official website	trueconf:[target] [@server]&[param_1]=[value_1]&[...]&[param_n]=[value_n]	
viber	Open the locally installed Viber application to link to a view or perform an action, such as share an URL to a contact.	Viber API Documentation - Deep Links Viber API Documentation - Viber Share Button	viber://pa?chatURI=⟨URI⟩ viber://pa/info?uri=⟨URI⟩ viber://forward?text=<ShareDescription>	
web+...	Effectively namespaces web-based protocols from other, potentially less web-secure, protocols	This convention is defined within the HTML Living Standard specification	web+⟨string of some lower-case alphabetic characters⟩:	This convention is not associated with the registration of any new scheme but is currently a requirement as well as convention for non-whitelisted web-based protocols.
zoommtg zoomus	Used by Zoom conferencing software to launch the Zoom client	Zoom developer community	zoommtg://zoom.us/join?confno=⟨confno⟩...	More information at Zoom developer community
spotify	Opens Spotify links in the app	Spotify for Developers	spotify://track:⟨trackid⟩	

== Registering schemes ==
Internet Engineering Task Force Best Current Practice (BCP) 35, Request for Comments (RFC) 7595, Guidelines and Registration Procedures for URI Schemes (updated by RFC 8615, Well-Known Uniform Resource Identifiers), defines the process for registering new URI scheme names. From time to time the process may change. The scheme registry maintains the mapping between scheme names and their specifications.
