= Internet resource locator =

Bank layers of security

Internet resource locators, described in RFC 1736, convey location and access information for resources. Typical examples of resources include network accessible documents, WAIS databases, FTP servers, and Telnet destinations.

Locators may apply to resources that are not always or not ever network accessible. Examples of the latter include human beings and physical objects that have no electronic instantiation (that is, objects without an existence completely defined by digital objects such as disk files).

A resource locator is a kind of resource identifier. Other kinds of resource identifiers allow names and descriptions to be associated with resources. A resource name is intended to provide a stable handle to refer to a resource long after the resource itself has moved or perhaps gone out of existence. A resource description comprises a body of meta-information to assist resource search and selection.

An Internet resource locator is a locator defined by an Internet resource location standard. A resource location standard in conjunction with resource description and resource naming standards specifies a comprehensive infrastructure for network-based information dissemination. Mechanisms for mapping between locators, names, and descriptive identifiers.

Network-based information resource providers require a method of describing the location of and access to their resources. Information systems users require a method whereby client software can interpret resource access and location descriptions on their behalf in a relatively transparent way. Without such a method, transparent and widely distributed, open information access on the Internet would be difficult if not impossible.

== See also ==
- Uniform Resource Identifier
